= Jankomir =

Neighborhood in Zagreb, Croatia

Coordinates: 45°48.3′N 15°51.5′E

Kika shopping center on Škorpikova Road

Jankomir (Croatian pronunciation: [ˈjɑŋkomiːr]) is a neighborhood in Zagreb, Croatia. It is located in the Stenjevec city district in the western part of the city, and is officially referred to as "Stenjevec - jug", with an area of 824.34 ha (2,037.0 acres) and a population of 8,072.

Jankomir is regarded citywide as a shopping destination since it houses several shopping centers. Its main arterial roads are Velimir Škorpik Road, Ljubljanska Avenue and Zagrebačka Avenue. Before the advent of the shopping centers Jankomir was mostly known for the nearby Jankomir interchange, a major interchange of the Zagreb bypass and Ljubljanska Avenue. Jankomir is also home to a psychiatric hospital of the same name.

== Shopping centers ==
After Croatia became independent in the 1990s, its capital city Zagreb gained influence and its economy boomed, attracting big store chains and shopping centers. Hoping to find way for cheap real estate, the shopping center operating companies pointed out mostly Jankomir because it was at that time on the sheer outskirts of the city, close to the inhabitants, inside the city proper and also with a low land price. The east was also an option, but few shopping centers settled there because the city was primarily expanding to the west and most of the Peščenica – Žitnjak district southeast of Radnička Road and Slavonska Avenue was inhabited by Romanies.

One of the first shopping centers to open was bauMax in 2000. Many others followed along the Škorpikova Road, including Solidum and Pevec in 2003. Soon, a cluster of centers beginning with King Cross and Bauhaus opened near the intersection with the Ljubljanska Avenue, directly accessible from the highway and only a few hundred meters from the Zagreb bypass. Škorpikova Road today also hosts supermarkets selling only food products. A number of other services and amenities are available at the shopping centers, such as ATMs, restaurants and free parking. A major problem for the shopping centers is mass transit, which is virtually nonexistent, although cars tend to bring enough customers. The intersection of Velimir Škorpik Road and Ljubljanska Avenue was recently upgraded to an interchange and it still experiences moderate congestion, worsened at the rush hour and near the end of shopping center working time. The latest addition to the shopping center repertoire is City Center One, located in the southwest, at the intersection of Jankomir Road and Savska Opatovina, close to a new roundabout with Ljubljanska/Zagrebačka Avenue.

== Road infrastructure ==
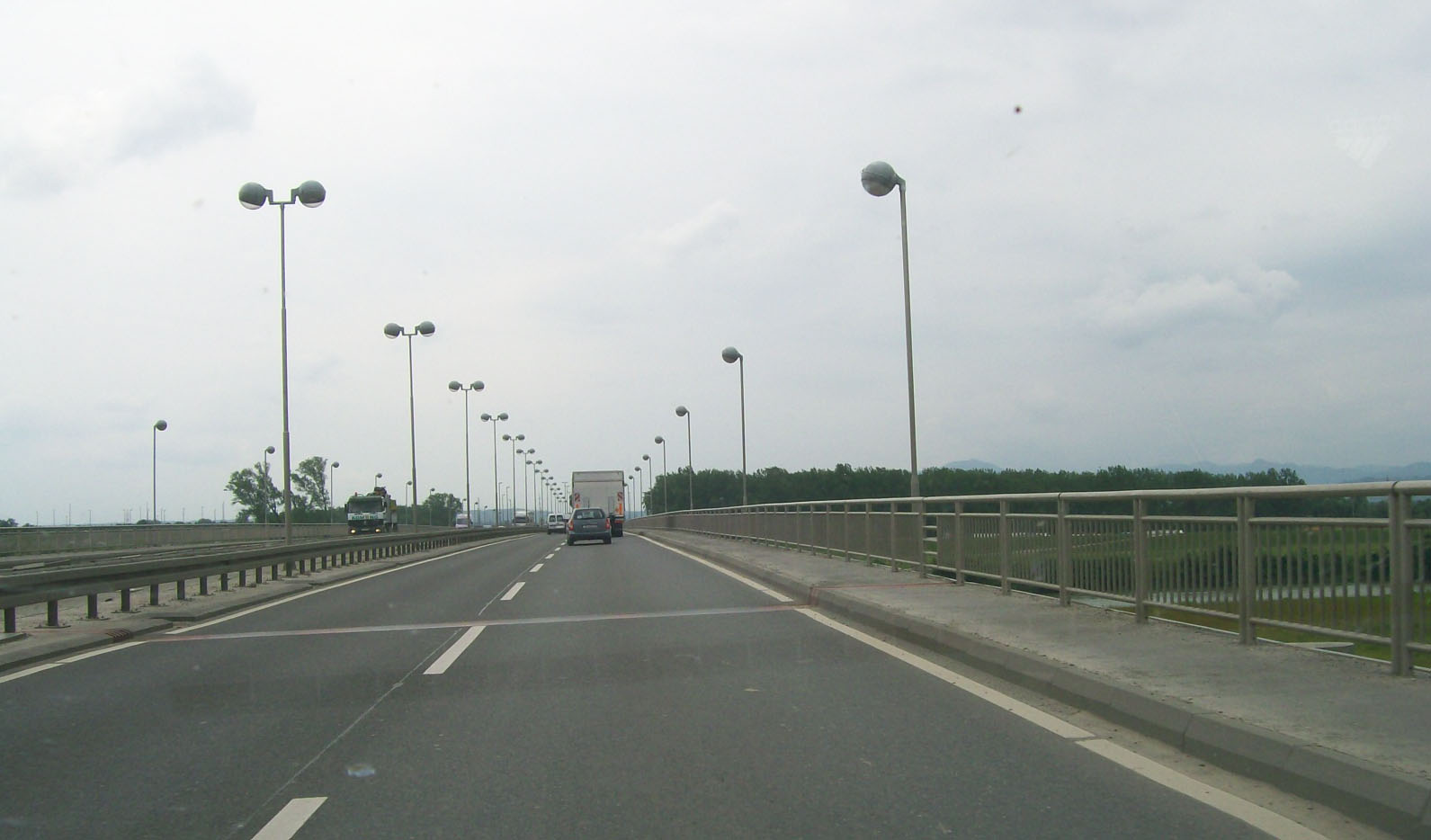
Driving on the Jankomir Bridge

Before the shopping industry, Jankomir was best known for the Jankomir Bridge, a two-lane beam bridge used for car traffic going towards the A3 highway to Samobor or Slovenia. The bridge was built in 1958, project having been made by Krunoslav Tonković. Being 330 meters long, it crosses the Sava River. The bridge was used as a part of the Highway "Brotherhood and Unity" (until the Zagreb bypass was constructed) and later Ljubljanska Avenue. As the Zagreb grew, the bridge's main use shifted from serving transit traffic with touristic and intercity travel purpose, to being used mostly by commuters from outer suburbs. The traffic situation worsened, but nothing was ever done to prevent the congestion. Only after the Škorpikova Road/Ljubljanska Avenue interchange did the construction of the second roadway start. The bridge was finally completed in 2006, having four lanes complete with street lighting. The speed limit was lifted from 90 km/h (56 mph) to 100 km/h (62 mph).

The other part of road infrastructure Jankomir is well known for is the Jankomir highway interchange on the Zagreb bypass. The motorways at Jankomir are maintained by Hrvatske autoceste (HAC). The interchange connects A2 and A3 highways with Ljubljanska Avenue. Because of the unusual layout of the modified cloverleaf interchange, as it is formally described, motorists on the A3 have to take an exit to continue straight. This layout is in use due to the A3 formerly serving as a part of the Highway "Brotherhood and Unity" until the Croatian War of Independence. The interchange is a structure of utmost importance. With over 110,000 cars using the interchange daily, Jankomir interchange is the third-busiest interchange in Zagreb (with Ivanja Reka and Lučko interchange surpassing its traffic levels). A3 west of the interchange uses a faux collector–distributor road scheme (the traffic flows don't converge back to A3 before the Jankomir interchange in the east) until the Rakitje/Ježdovec exit for the Lučko Airport. On this stretch, the highway has 5 lanes going westbound and 4 lanes eastbound. Together with another collector–distributor system inside the interchange adding to this one, the interchange is often complex to navigate, some turns requiring the motorist to take up to 4 exit ramps to reach their destination, although the interchange makes up for this in extensive signage. Due to the collector–distributor systems gaining more total lanes in the interchange, jams on the exit ramps are extremely rare.

== Geography and cityscape ==
Apart from the abovementioned shopping centers situated mostly along the southern end of Škorpikova Road, Jankomir is mostly industrialized. The hilly Susedgrad is located directly north of Jankomir, but Jankomir is mainly on flat land. The informal northern border of the neighborhood is always determined as either Bologna Alley or the rail line running on its southern side. The rail line was the primary transportation problem of Jankomir for decades. East of Stenjevec, the line is elevated, allowing roads to pass under it. In Jankomir the only road passing under the line is Škorpikova Road, which requires an interchange with Bologna Alley to avoid a steep grade between the intersection and rail underpass. A solution has recently been provided in the form of more underpasses, but elevating the rail line still remains a taboo for mayors.

Even with the level of industrialization and commercialization, Jankomir does have pockets of family houses. Although not as rural anymore and mostly built on subdivided parcels, residential parts are mostly on the Samoborska Road, located within walking distance of the railway. At the east, nearing Malešnica, the expansion of inner city is inevitable, sporting multi-family homes and low-rise apartment buildings. There are no schools in Jankomir yet, so most students attend Ban Josip Jelačić or Dragutin Domjanić elementary schools.
