= Svetice =

Svetice may refer to:

- Světice, a municipality and village in Czech Republic
- Svetice, Karlovac County, a village in Croatia
- Svetice, a street and transit terminal in Maksimir and Stara Peščenica, Zagreb, Croatia
- Donje Svetice, a section of Peščenica, Zagreb, Croatia
