= Nightmare Stage =

Croatian Television Series

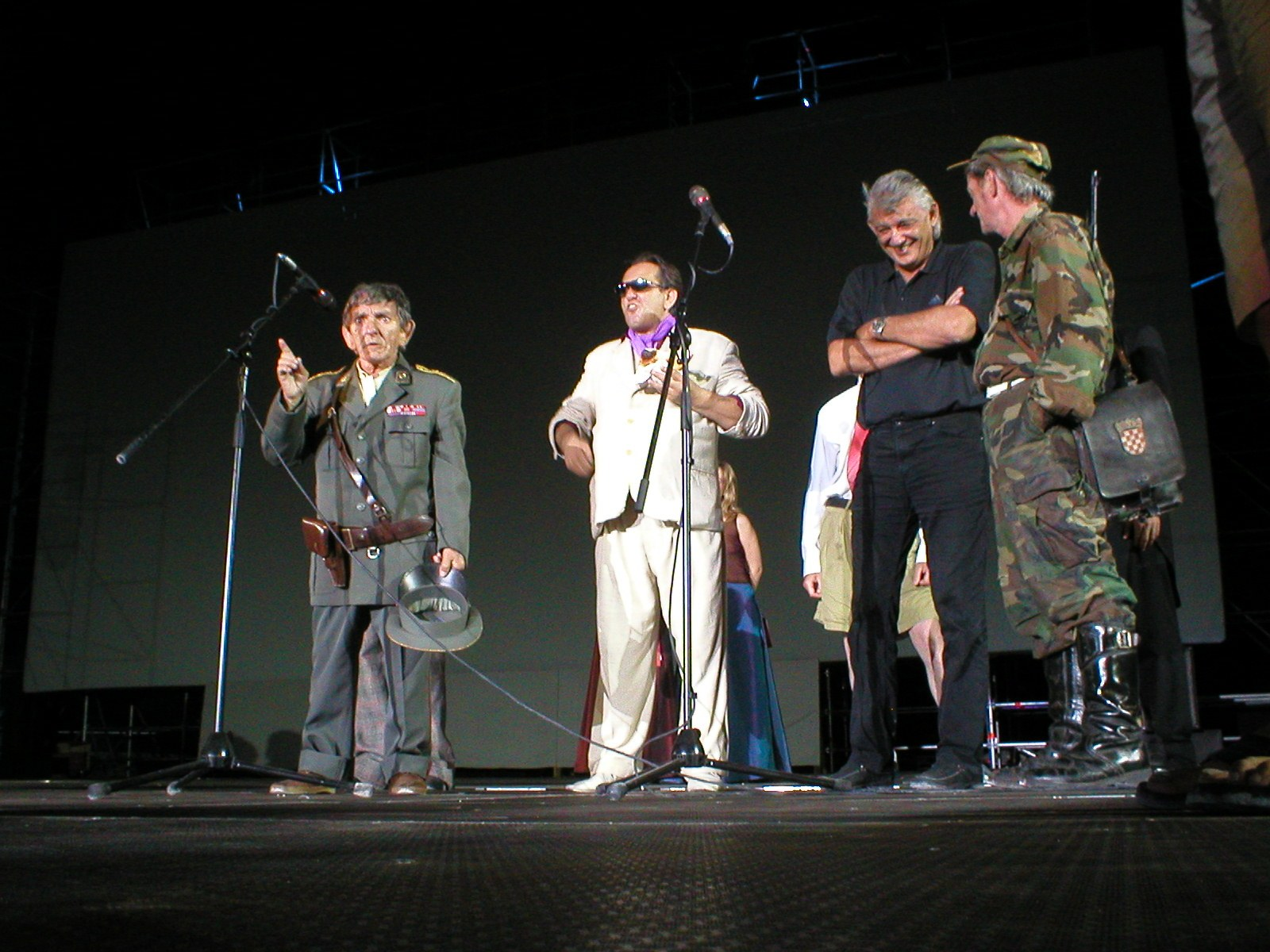
- Ševa, CroRom, Malnar and Stankec Nightmare Stage members on stage in 2003.
- Genre: Late-night talk show
- Created by: Željko Malnar
- Country of origin: Croatia
- Original language: Croatian
- No. of episodes: 879

Production
- Production locations: Stara Peščenica, Zagreb

Original release
- Network: OTV
- Release: October 3, 1992 – April 23, 2005
- Network: Z1
- Release: April 30, 2005 – June 26, 2010

Related
- Nemoguća eMisija

Nightmare Stage by Željko Malnar (original title in English, later also in Croatian Noćna mora Željka Malnara) is a late night talk show hosted by maverick traveler and author Željko Malnar. It was broadcast live on Croatian station OTV from October 3, 1992, to April 23, 2005, then picked up by Z1 from April 30, 2005 until the show's end on June 26, 2010.

The contact anti-show pushed the boundaries of Croatian television programming. Its air time varied during its run, starting at 10:00 p.m. or midnight on Saturday night, with a flexible ending time, typically between 6:00 and 8:00 a.m. The host threw all tact and taste through the window, taking rough manners from the street to the screen without either diluting them with etiquette or stylizing them for theatrical effect. He regularly asked his guests uncomfortable and aggressive questions in order to expose their flaws, often escalating to flat-out insults which the guests frequently reciprocated. The show also had elements of a freak show, recurrently featuring fringe-of-society characters of picturesque mental makeups (nicknamed Cezar, Tarzan, Jaran, Braco, Emir, Remzo, Laki, Ševa, Ivek, Darijan, Darkec, Stankec, Hasan, Gibo from Kutina...) picked up from the streets of Peščenica, Malnar's Zagreb neighborhood. Malnar has ostensibly proclaimed Peščenica an independent republic with him acting as the president and the cast as his cabinet.

The show occasionally ended with Malnar's angry message to viewers/caller "Jadnici, ugasite televizor i idite spavati! Idiote, zar nemaš pametnijeg posla, nego gledati televiziju u tri ujutro! Hajde, laku noć! Što je, bijedniče, nemaš novaca za biti vani, nego moraš mene gledati na svome malom crnobijelom televizoru?" (You miserable folk, turn off the TV and go to sleep! You idiot, don't you have a better thing to do at 3AM than watch TV? Come on, good night! What's up, you wretch, have no money to go out on a Saturday night so you must watch me on your pathetic little black-and-white TV?)

Nightmare Stage was also the title of a column written by Malnar regularly appearing in the weekly Globus.

On October 4, 2003 Nightmare Stage hosted Dennis Rodman who came to Zagreb solely for the program after a Croatian friend brought the show to his attention via internet streaming. Upon the customary taking of telephone calls, many female viewers flirted with Rodman and openly proposed him sex whereupon he readily invited them to his hotel room, giving the address on air in the studio.

The show has also hosted many famous people from Croatia, including: Stjepan Mesić, Josip Manolić, Miroslav Tuđman, Tomislav Merčep, Boris Mikšić, Anto Kovačević, Davor Štern, Hrvoje Šarinić, Vesna Škare-Ožbolt, Slaven Letica, Žarko Puhovski, Tonino Picula, Vlatko Marković, Miroslav Blažević, Mirko Filipović, Mišo Kovač, Dino Dvornik and Siniša Vuco.

In 2004 the cast of the show starred in a feature film of the same name.

On May 5, 2010, the most popular character Zvonimir Levačić - Ševa (born December 12, 1943) died aged 66. Following the death of Ševa, Nightmare Stage formally ended on June 26, 2010, after almost 18 years of live airing and 879 episodes.

From 2016 to 2020, part of the crew continued work in similar show named Nemoguća eMisija.

== Characters ==
- Željko Malnar, president; (1992–2010)
- Zvonimir Levačić - Ševa, minister of defense; (2000–2010)
- Sead Hasanović - Braco CroRom or Braco Cigan, Roma people minority defense; (2000–2010)
- Nediljko Alagušić - Tarzan, minister of moral; (1995–2010)
- Vlado Matijević - Jaran aka Jajan, official journalist; (2002–2009)
- Nenad Blatnik - Cezar, singer and former boxing champion; (2001–2006)
- Stanislav Hrenović - Stankec, citizen in Republic of Peščenica; (2001–2010)
- Ivica Lako - Laki, official dancer and marijuana smoker; (2003–2010)
- Remzo "Krak" Sirotković, poet; (2001–2010)
- Siniša Polovina - Gibo of Kutina, winner of musical competition 'Dora-Mora' 2007 in Republic of Peščenica; (2002–2010)
- Emir Ilijaš - Emir, erotic poet; (1993–2010)
- Ivan Plehan - Ivek, best accordion player ever born; (2000–2006)
- Darko Đugumović - Darko, imitator music group Colonia; (2002–2010)
- Bruno Tomašić - Anđa, singer representing Croatian LGBT community; (2002–2010)
- Ljubomir Đomešić - Ljubo, mastermind and thinker of 21st Century; (2004–2008)
- Darko Dijanović - Darkec, 50 years old virgin from Bjelovar who's seeking a perfect woman and a Croat citizen who wants to become a Serbian; (2000–2008)
- Darijan Mišak - Dačo aka Galeb, best performer ever of song "Moj galebe"; (2000–2007)
- Krešimir Ricijaš - Giovanni, multiple personality disorder, imagines that he is a commercial airline pilot (2003–2005)
- Zoran Krivić, man who sells stolen and forgery paintings live on TV; (2000–2010)
- Milan Radonjić - Milan Tarot, tarot card reader in the Balkan region; (2009–2010)
