= Zagreb bypass =

Road in Croatia

Coordinates: 45°45′12″N 15°59′27″E

- in use other motorways

Route information
- Part of
- Length: 48.9 km (30.4 mi)

Major junctions
- Beltway around Zagreb
- From: A2 in Zaprešić interchange
- A3 in Jankomir interchange A1 in Lučko interchange A3 in Ivanja Reka interchange
- To: A4 and D10 in Sveta Helena interchange

Location
- Country: Croatia
- Counties: City of Zagreb, Zagreb County
- Major cities: Zagreb, Velika Gorica, Samobor, Zaprešić

Highway system
- Highways in Croatia

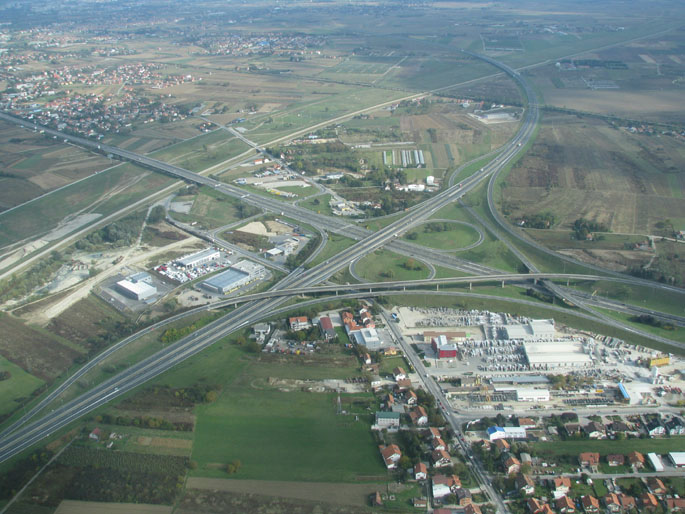
Lučko interchange (viewed from the west), Zagreb's gateway to the Adriatic coast

Zagreb bypass (Croatian: Zagrebačka obilaznica) is a U-shaped motorway partially encircling Zagreb, Croatia. The largest part by far, between Jankomir and Ivanja Reka interchanges, was built between 1977 and 1979, while the Ivanja Reka – Sveta Helena section was built between 1996 and 1999. The bypass is 48.9 kilometres (30.4 mi) long, tracing around the city from the northwestern suburb of Zaprešić to Sveta Helena in the northeast. The bypass crosses the Sava River twice and comprises a bridge across the Sava-Odra floodwater overflow canal. As the busiest sections between Jankomir and Buzin interchanges carry traffic volume of approximately 45,000 AADT, it is the most heavily used motorway sector in Croatia.

Zagreb bypass is not designated as a separate motorway with a distinct motorway number, rather it consists of sections of three motorways:

Motorway	Sections
A2	Zaprešić – Zagreb zapad (Jankomir)
A3	Zagreb zapad (Jankomir) - Lučko - Buzin - Kosnica - Zagreb istok (Ivanja Reka)
A4	Zagreb istok (Ivanja Reka) - Sesvete - Popovec - Sveta Helena

Those motorway sections are concurrent with sections of the D1 and D3 state roads as well as European routes E59, E65, E70 and E71.

The bypass currently comprises four traffic lanes along its entire length, with an emergency lane in each direction. In its current form, the Zagreb bypass has a small number of interchanges spaced widely apart. For example, the current Zaprešić interchange extends a trip from Zaprešić to Zagreb via the bypass by 4.5 km (2.8 mi). The last new interchange was built in 2007–2008 at Kosnica in the southeast, to connect the Homeland Bridge and Zagreb via Radnička cesta (Ž1029).

There are two rest areas along the bypass: Lučko rest area is located between Jankomir and Lučko interchanges comprising famous Plitvice Motel, well known for its pedestrian bridge across the bypass, while Sesvete rest area is located between Popovec and Sveta Helena interchanges. A new rest area is planned between Jakuševec and Kosnica interchanges.

== Future expansion ==
A new outer bypass motorway is planned

A proposal has been made in 2007 for a new interchange near Zaprešić, one that would reduce traveling time between the cities.

As a part of the A11 motorway construction works, a new Jakuševec interchange was built east of the Buzin interchange. The Buzin interchange in turn is planned to be abolished, in favour of another new interchange, Sveta Klara, further to the west.

A long-term plan exists to build a new outer bypass road around Zagreb. The outer bypass would be a part of the tolled motorway network thus permitting vehicles not to stop at two toll plazas near Zagreb as they enter and leave the present bypass, decreasing congestion on the inner bypass motorway. 2009–2012 motorway and road construction plan entails funds for development of design documents for the outer bypass motorway and specifies its route: It is to be a 106 km (66 mi) long motorway originating from the A2 motorway Luka interchange, connecting the A3 motorway Gradina interchange near Samobor, the A1 motorway Horvati interchange, the A11 motorway Mraclin interchange, once again the A3 motorway Ivanić Grad interchange and finally the A4 motorway Zelina interchange. A total of 14 interchanges are planned on the new bypass, including the ones connecting it to the other motorways already specified, connecting the outer bypass to all major roads intersected.

Because of the Medvednica Mountain north of Zagreb, the present bypass is U-shaped, leaving the city without a northern bypass that would connect the A2 and A4 highways. A northern branch (around 27 km long) of the bypass was planned and designed to bridge the gap. It was planned to connect the Zaprešić interchange with the Popovec interchange. The route would have required a number of long tunnels and viaducts making it expensive. According to the general design alternative in a study executed by the Faculty of Architecture and Institut IGH, the route would comprise 15 tunnels. The tunnels longer than 500 m would be: Ivanec Tunnel (2656 m), Borčec Tunnel (1797 m), Pantovčak Tunnel (1625 m), Dotrščina Tunnel (1050 m), Remete 1 Tunnel (1025 m), Čuguvec Tunnel (550 m) and Novaki Tunnel (502 m). The construction works were planned in stages with an additional 5–10 km long tunnel built subsequently through Medvednica Mountain to connect Zagreb and Hrvatsko zagorje directly. However, as of September 2011, all such plans were cancelled as unfeasible.

Croatian Motorways has started the realization of the project of building the third lane on the Zagreb bypass. Thus, HAC and the consortium led by the IGH Institute signed a contract for the development of a preliminary design, environmental impact assessment and obtaining a location permit for the reconstruction of the Zagreb bypass from Jankomir to Ivanja Reka by upgrading the third lane and for the main and detailed design and obtaining a building permit, for the busiest section, Jankomir - Lučko. The estimated value of the investment for the expansion of the entire bypass is around HRK 800 million, and the exact amount will be known after the development of the preliminary design. Construction could begin in 2023.

== Exit list ==
County	km	Exit	Name	Destination	Notes
Zagreb	0.0	6	Zaprešić	A2 E59 D1 D225	Connection to Zaprešić and Zagreb via Aleja Bologne and Ilica. The westernmost interchange of the Zagreb bypass. Westbound traffic continues along the northbound A2 motorway towards Krapina and Maribor, Slovenia. The D1 road is not physically signposted along the Zagreb bypass.
Zagreb	2.9	Sava River Bridge			
City of Zagreb	7.4	7/4	Zagreb zapad	A3 E70 Ž1035	Connection to the A3 motorway (E70) (connecting Samobor and Ljubljana, Slovenia to the west) and to Zagreb via the Ž1035 road. The southern terminus of the European route E59. For the eastbound traffic the exit is signposted as A2 exit number 7, and for the westbound traffic the exit is signposted as A3 exit number 3. The Zagreb bypass switches between the A2 (to the west) and the A3 (to the east) at this point.
City of Zagreb	10.9	Rest area traffic sign	Zagreb rest area		
City of Zagreb	12.3	5/1	Lučko	A1 D1 D3 E65 E71 Ž1040	Connection to A1 motorway and to the City of Zagreb via Jadranska Avenue. The western terminus of European routes E65/E71 concurrency. The eastern terminus of the D1 state road concurrency and the western terminus of D3 state road concurrency; the state roads are not signposted along the Zagreb bypass.
City of Zagreb	19.0		Sveta Klara	L10100	A planned connection to the City of Zagreb via Novi Zagreb and Većeslava Holjevca Avenue
City of Zagreb	21.1	6	Buzin	D30 Ž1038	Connection to the City of Zagreb via Savezne Republike Njemačke Street and Novi Zagreb, Zagreb airport and to Velika Gorica
City of Zagreb	22.1	7	Jakuševec	A11 Ž1039	Interchange to the A11 motorway (under construction), providing connections to Zagreb via Sarajevska Road and to Velika Gorica. As of 2017, the interchange is fully built, but access to and from the north end is impossible as the interchange has not yet been connected to Sarajevska Road.
Zagreb	29.3	8	Kosnica	D31 Ž1029	Connection to the City of Zagreb via Radnička Road (Ž1029 to the north) and to Velika Gorica and Zagreb Airport (D31 to the south; the southern ramp under construction as of October 2010)
Zagreb	33.4	Sava River Bridge			
Zagreb	34.1	9/13	Zagreb istok	A3 E70 Ž1035	Connection to the A3 motorway leading east towards Slavonski Brod and Osijek. Connection to the City of Zagreb via Ž1035. The eastern terminus of European route E70 concurrency. For the westbound traffic the exit is signposted as A4 exit number 12, and for the eastbound traffic the exit is signposted as A3 exit number 6. The Zagreb bypass switches between the A3 (to the west) and the A4 (to the east) at this point.
City of Zagreb	34.9	12	Sesvete	Ž3034	Connection to Sesvete and Dugo Selo
City of Zagreb	38.1	11	Popovec	D3	Connection to Popovec and Soblinec (D29); The northern terminus of concurrency of the A4 motorway and the D3 state road. The D3 road is not physically signposted along the Zagreb bypass.
City of Zagreb	42.0	Rest area traffic sign	Sesvete rest area		
Zagreb	48.9	10	Sveta Helena	A4 E65 E71 D10 Ž3016	Connection to Vrbovec and Križevci via D10 expressway. Connection to Rakovec, Sveta Helena and Donja Zelina (D3) (via the Ž3016); The easternmost interchange of the Zagreb bypass. The eastbound traffic defaults to the northbound A4.
1.000 mi = 1.609 km; 1.000 km = 0.621 mi: Incomplete access; Unopened

== Incidents ==
On September 29, 2021, highway patrol workers noticed increased vibrations on the Sava River Bridge between Jankomir and Zaprešić interchanges along the bypass. The preliminary investigation has shown that one of the bearings of the bridge on the abutment was damaged. The section of the bypass between Jankomir and Zaprešić interchange has been closed for traffic, causing large traffic jams throughout Zagreb.

== See also ==
- Hrvatske autoceste
- Autocesta Zagreb - Macelj
