= Sava River Bridge (A3) =

Girder bridge in Croatia

Sava Bridge
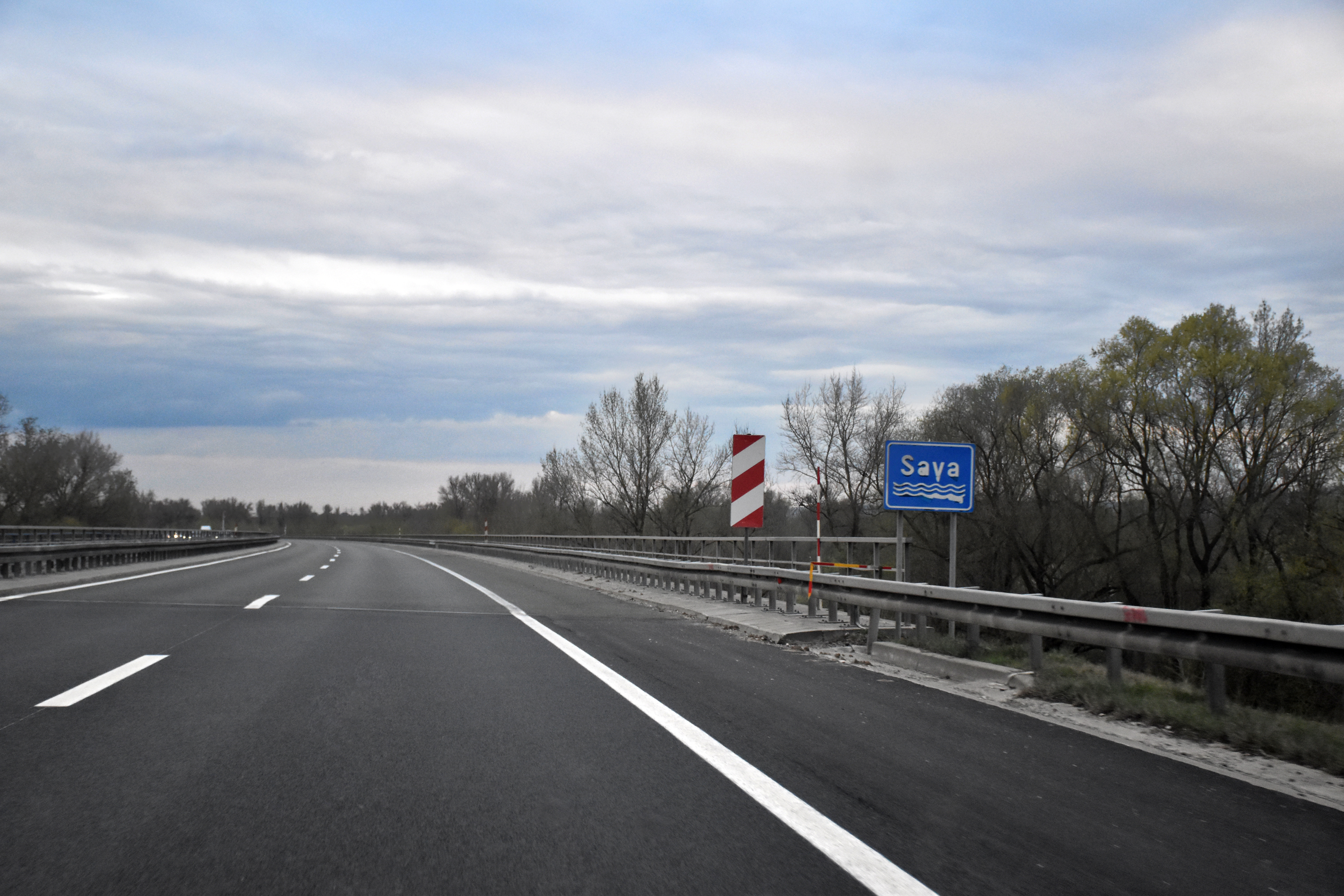
- Coordinates: 45.787846°N 16.124175°E
- Carries: road vehicles
- Crosses: Sava River
- Locale: Central Croatia
- Official name: Most Sava
- Maintained by: Hrvatske autoceste

Characteristics
- Design: Girder bridge
- Total length: 1064.5 m
- Width: 2 x 10.5 m

History
- Opened: 1981

Location
- Interactive map of Sava Bridge

The Sava Bridge is located between Kosnica and Ivanja Reka interchanges of the A3 motorway near Zagreb in Croatia, spanning Sava River. It is 1,064.5 metres (3,492 ft) long, and it comprises four traffic lanes and two emergency lanes. Construction work on the Sava Bridge started in 1977 and was opened to traffic in 1981. When completed, the bridge was the largest, in terms of its plan area, prefabricated girder bridge in Croatia. The bridge was designed by Zvonimir Lončarić and built by Hidroelektra, Zagreb.

== Description ==
The bridge consists of three major sections. The southern foreshore is spanned by 39-metre (128 ft) prefabricated reinforced concrete girders freely supported across neoprene bearings on top of pier cap beams spanning 40 m (130 ft) + 12 x 41 m (135 ft) = 532 metres (1,745 ft). The central section of the bridge consists of cantilevers and suspended 39-metre (128 ft) prefabricated reinforced concrete girders, and is 328.5 metres (1,078 ft) long. The southern foreshore is spanned by a structure identical to the one on the northern foreshore, except it is shorter as it spans 40 m (130 ft) + 4 x 41 m (135 ft) = 204 metres (669 ft). Bridge piers are thin and slender to minimize any disruption to Sava River course. Bridge foundations are executed on "Benoto" piles. The bridge is executed as two parallel structure – each carrying one motorway carriageway.

The bridge is located in a horizontal curve comprising 4,000-metre (13,000 ft) radius and a vertical convex curve of 20,000-metre (66,000 ft) radius, as it crosses the river at a 76 degree angle relative to the riverbed. Due to the oblique angle of the crossing, the riverbed spanned is 230 metres (750 ft) wide at the point of the crossing. The deck surface exhibits symmetrical 2% grade towards the banks.

Between 2005 and 2010 a thorough rehabilitation of the bridge was performed to remedy some details, execution shortcomings recorded since 1981 and damage caused by intensive use of salt during winter use of the bridge.

== Traffic volume ==
Volume of traffic using the Sava River bridge is not reported regularly by Hrvatske ceste in their annual bulletin on Croatian road traffic volume. Conversely, such information is gathered from time to time and made available through various published studies, published by the City of Zagreb or Hrvatske ceste. A study related to a proposed northern Zagreb bypass specifies Annual average daily traffic (AADT) of 36,393 on the A3 motorway section comprising the bridge. However, that figure applies to year 2004, and the adjacent motorway sections, where AADT is published regularly, display a 30% increase in traffic between 2004 and 2009, and a similar increase of traffic volume may be expected to be observed on the bridge.

Dobra Bridge traffic volume
Road	Counting site	AADT	ASDT	Notes
A3	-	36,393	not available	Between Buzin and Ivanja Reka interchanges (2004)

== See also ==
- List of bridges by length
