= Republic of Peščenica =

Satirical Micronation in Europe

Republic of Peščenica Republika Peščenica
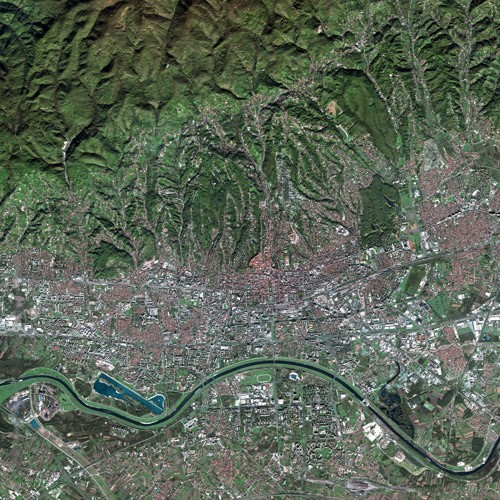
- Satellite picture of Zagreb. Peščenica is on the northern side of River Sava, resembling a large whitish rectangular patch, northwards from the big white object next to the river.

Area
  - Total: 1.30 km^{2} (0.50 sq mi)

Population
  - Estimate: 6,400
- Today part of: Croatia

The Republic of Peščenica (Croatian: Republika Peščenica) was a satirical-parodical project of Croatian Željko Malnar named after the Zagreb neighbourhood of Peščenica.

Events were aired on anti-TV-show Nightmare Stage (Noćna mora), on Saturdays from 22:00 until the early morning hours on Z1, and transmitted via satellite. Events were described in short version in Malnar's column in the Globus magazine from Zagreb.

For a short period of time, shortened (and censored) versions of previous shows were aired on Croatian national TV in May 2007 (as "Privremeni tjednik"; only five episodes).

It was located in Peščenica, a working-class neighbourhood in Zagreb. The neighbourhood is in the northern part of the city (northwards from Sava river), southeastwards from the city center.

The project ended with the end of the TV-Show in 2010 after the "minister of defense", Zvonimir Levačić-Ševa, died.

Anthem is Peščenice bijela and Danijela. Željko Malnar & Soma Dollara: Dobro jutro, Peščenico.

== Presidents ==
- Željko Malnar (1944–2013) (3 October 1992 – 9 July 2013)
- Sead Hasanović – Braco (1953–present) (9 July 2013 – present)

== Personalities ==
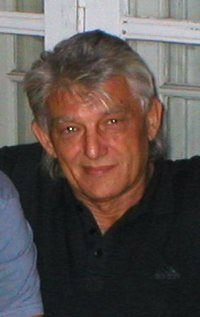
Željko Malnar, the self-styled president of the Republic of Peščenica

- Željko Malnar, the president
- Zvonimir Levačić - Ševa, minister of defense

== Cultural manifestations ==
- Dora Noćna mora, song contest (parody on Croatian Eurovision qualification contest Dora; name is rhyming, made of Dora and Noćna mora, title of the TV-show)

== Famous actions ==
- Voluntary surrender and extradition of Malnar's generals and ministers to The Hague and ICTY ("You go there, so I don't have to go."), a parody on the same events from reality.
- R. Peščenica's (military) returning of Savudrijska vala and giving it back to Croatia ("Because our friendly neighbor Croatia doesn't have balls to do it herself."). Parody on Croatian-Slovenian border dispute about Savudrijska vala (Bay of Savudrija).
- Involving Peščenican personalities into Croatian political life (elections). Includes Jajan's political plan: forming of Flašistička stranka (parody to Fascist (Croatian: Fašist) -> Flašist, originating from German: Flasche, bottle: "bottleist", "drinkers' party") and leading of Peščenica into Vrapče (a parody on paroles "leading of Croatia into EU"; Vrapče is a neighborhood in northwest Zagreb known for its psychiatric hospital)

== Literature ==
- Željko Malnar: Filozofija Republike Peščenice, Birotisak, Zagreb, 2004., ISBN 953-6156-31-8
