= Ivanja Reka =

- Village
- Interactive map of Ivanja Reka
- Location within Croatia
- Country: Croatia
- County: City of Zagreb
- City District: Peščenica - Žitnjak

Area
  - Total: 1.4 sq mi (3.5 km^{2})

Population (2021)
  - Total: 1,753
  - Density: 1,300/sq mi (500/km^{2})
- Time zone: UTC+1 (CET)
  - Summer (DST): UTC+2 (CEST)

Ivanja Reka is a neighborhood located in the eastern part of the Peščenica - Žitnjak city district of Zagreb, Croatia.

Its main thoroughfare is the Slavonska Avenue. The nearby Ivanja Reka interchange is a major highway interchange of Slavonska Avenue/A3 and the Zagreb bypass, located east of the neighborhood. Ivanja Reka is located east of Resnik.

Ivanja Reka was administratively party of Dugo Selo until 1988, when it was included in the City of Zagreb.

== Demographics ==
According to the 2021 census, its population is 1,753. The population was 2,034.
