= Lučko interchange =

- Croatian: Čvor Lučko
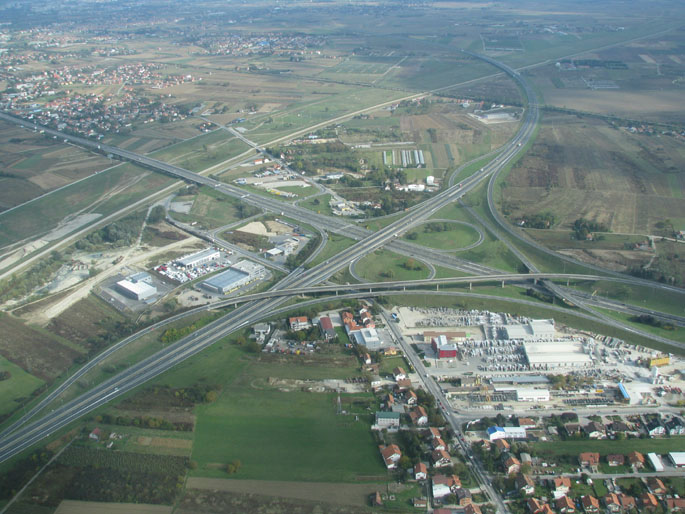
- View from northwest; the main, top-to-bottom road is A3, the road to the right is A1, the road to the left is Jadranska Avenue and the residential road at the bottom is D1 in Lučko

Location
- Zagreb, Croatia
- Coordinates: 45.758901°N 15.899963°E
- Roads at junction: A1; A3 D1 Ž1040

Construction
- Type: Parclo/stack hybrid

The Lučko interchange (Croatian: Čvor Lučko) is a hybrid (Full Y/Half-clover) interchange in Zagreb, Croatia. It is named after the nearby Zagreb neighborhood of Lučko. The interchange represents the northern terminus of the A1 motorway and it connects the A1 route to the A3 motorway between Jankomir interchange and Buzin exit, also representing a part of Zagreb bypass. The interchange is a part of Pan-European corridors Vb and X. It also represents a junction of European routes E65, E70 and E71.

The interchange was originally executed as Zagreb–Karlovac motorway terminus exit, connecting the motorway to the city of Zagreb itself directly. Following construction of Zagreb bypass towards Jankomir (westward), the interchange was expanded, but it was still used as a motorway exit connecting to the city of Zagreb via Jadranska Avenue and to Lučko via the D1 state road. Once the bypass, i.e. A3 motorway, was extended eastward to Ivanja Reka interchange, the Lučko interchange gained its present form.

== See also ==
- Bosiljevo 2 interchange
- International E-road network
- Transport in Croatia
