= Sava Bridge =

Sava Bridge may refer to:

- Ada Bridge, a cable-stayed bridge over the Sava river in Belgrade, Serbia
- Sava River Bridge (A3), an A3 motorway bridge in Croatia
- Sava Bridge, Zagreb, a pedestrian bridge in Zagreb, Croatia
- Rača Bridge, bridge over Sava between Serbia and Republika Srpska, Bosnia and Herzegovina
