= Peščenica – Žitnjak =

City district of Zagreb, Croatia

Coordinates: 45°47′36.39″N 16°2′54.46″E

- District of Zagreb
- Peščenica - Žitnjak as a part of Zagreb
- Country: Croatia
- County/City: Zagreb

Government
  - Council President: Tomica Rižmarić (M!-SDP)
  - District Council: Composition (19): M!-SDP (10); HDZ-DP-HSU-HSS (4); Davor Bernardić list (2); Pavle Kalinić-ZDS list (1); BUZ-Plavi grad (1); Only Croatia-DOMiNO-HS-Blok (1)

Area
  - Total: 35.296 km^{2} (13.628 sq mi)

Population (2021)
  - Total: 53,023
  - Density: 1,502.2/km^{2} (3,890.8/sq mi)

Map

Peščenica – Žitnjak is a city district in the southeastern part of Zagreb, Croatia. It consists of two parts: Peščenica (pronounced [peʃt͡ʃeˈnit͡sa]), a set of neighborhoods; and Žitnjak (pronounced [ˈʒitɲak]), a large industrial zone on the city outskirts. The district has a total population of 56,487 (2011 census).

The smaller neighbourhoods that form the core of Peščenica, bordering Maksimir, Donji grad and Trnje, include:

- Stara Peščenica
- Donje Svetice
- Volovčica
- Ferenščica

These neighborhoods are delineated by major city arterials, such as the Slavonska Avenue and Vukovarska Avenue.

To the northeast, bordering Donja Dubrava, there are:

- Borongaj (local administration "Bruno Bušić")
- Borongaj Lugovi
- Vukomerec

To the southwest, bordering Trnje, there are:

- Folnegovićevo naselje
- local administration "Janko Matko"
- Borovje, administratively part of Savica–Šanci

The places in the outer rim, around and beyond Žitnjak, include:

- Kozari Bok
- Kozari putevi
- Savica–Šanci
- Petruševec
- Resnik
- Ivanja Reka
- Žitnjak (Struge)

== History ==
Stara Peščenica and Volovčica were first planned in 1913 and built after World War I. Donje Svetice, Ferenščica, Borongaj, Folnegovićevo naselje and Vukomerec were started then and built up mostly after World War II.

Žitnjak is named after wheat (Croatian: žito), as it used to be the location of wheat fields. In 1865, it was a small settlement of 10 houses and 177 inhabitants. After World War II, it became an industrial zone.

Resnik and Ivanja Reka were previously villages, and their first mention dates from 1217. They were urbanized after World War II, particularly in the 1980s.

Ivanja Reka remains a standalone settlement, but Resnik stopped being tracked as one after 1971, when it had 456 residents.

Peščenica has been made famous locally by its resident and self-proclaimed president of the "Republic of Peščenica" Željko Malnar, a maverick traveler, author and talk show host.
