= Petina =

Petina may refer to:

- Petina, Campania, Italian municipality of the Province of Salerno, Campania
- Petina (Kruševac), Serbian village of Kruševac municipality, in Rasina District
- Petina, Croatia, a village in the Velika Gorica municipality, Zagreb County

== See also ==
- Petina Gappah (born 1971), Zimbabwean lawyer and writer
- Patina
