= Malnar =

Malnar may refer to:

- Željko Malnar, Croatian author and TV personality
- Malignant narcissism
- "Malignant Narcissism" (song), by Rush
