= A3 (Croatia) =

Motorway in Croatia

A3 motorway
- Autocesta A3
- Autocesta Bregana - Lipovac
- in use other motorways

Route information
- Part of E65 E70 E71
- Length: 306.5 km (190.5 mi)

Major junctions
- From: Slovenian A2 at Bregana border crossing
- A2 in Jankomir interchange A1 in Lučko interchange A11 in Jakuševec interchange A4 in Ivanja Reka interchange D5 in Okučani interchange D525 in Slavonski Brod zapad (west) interchange A5 in Sredanci interchange D55 in Županja interchange
- To: Serbian A3 at Bajakovo border crossing

Location
- Country: Croatia
- Counties: City of Zagreb, Zagreb County, Sisak-Moslavina, Brod-Posavina, Vukovar-Srijem
- Major cities: Zagreb, Kutina, Nova Gradiška, Slavonski Brod, Županja

Highway system
- Highways in Croatia

The A3 motorway (Croatian: Autocesta A3) is a major motorway in Croatia spanning 306.5 kilometres (190.5 mi). The motorway connects Zagreb, the nation's capital, to the historical Slavonia region of Croatia and a number of cities along the Sava River. It represents a major east–west transportation corridor in Croatia and a significant part of the Pan-European Corridor X, serving as a transit route between the European Union states and the Balkans. Apart from Zagreb, where the A3 motorway comprises a considerable part of the Zagreb bypass, the motorway runs near a number of significant Croatian cities.

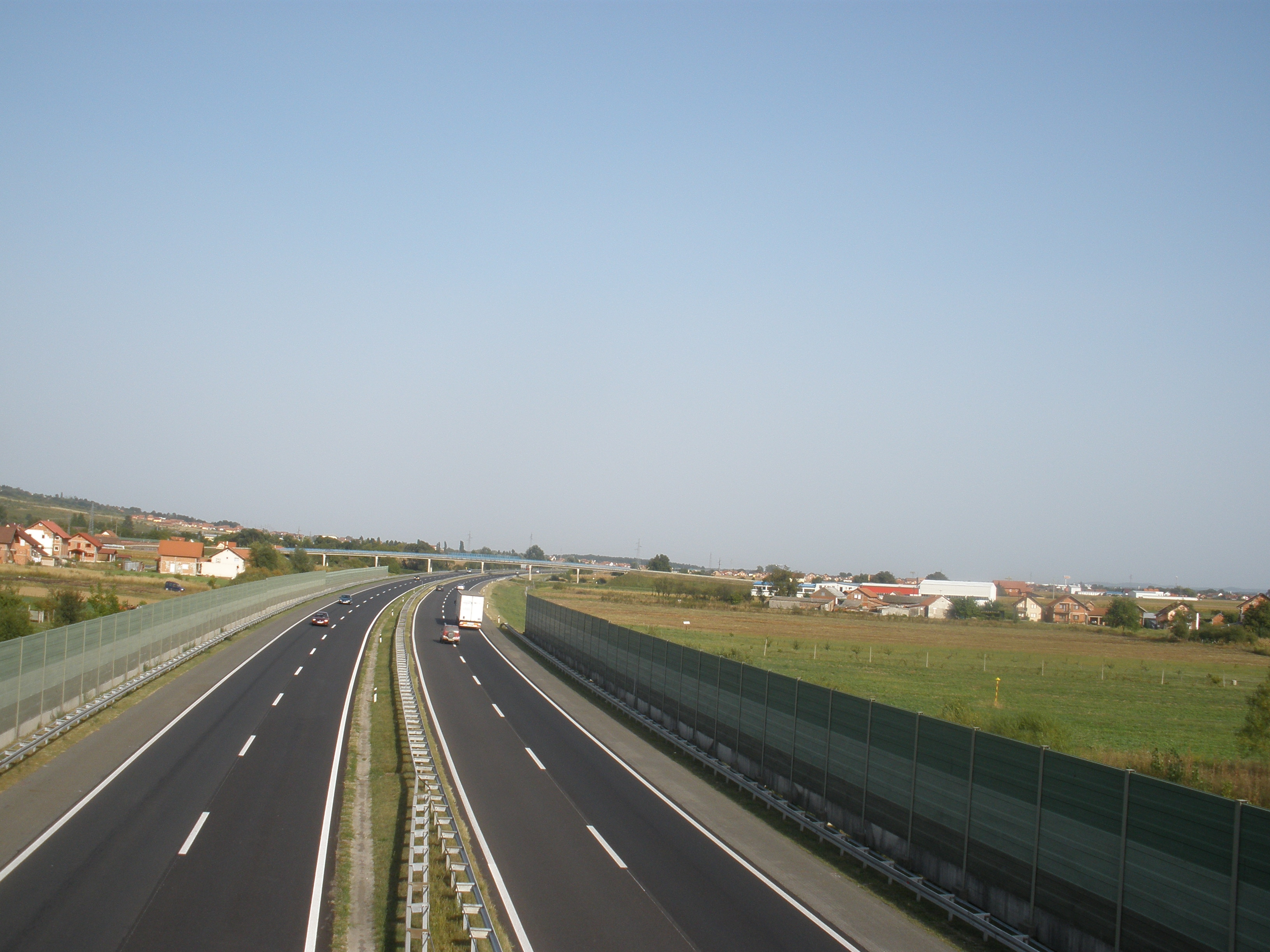
The A3 motorway near Slavonski Brod

The motorway consists of two traffic lanes and an emergency lane in each driving direction, separated by a central reservation. All intersections of the A3 motorway are grade separated, and the motorway comprises several large stack and cloverleaf interchanges at junctions with four other motorways in Croatia: A1, A2, A4 and A5. There is a cloverleaf interchange is on the A3 route, where the A11 motorway is scheduled to branch off. The route comprises a large number of bridges and culverts, but has no tunnels because it runs through plains. The Sava River Bridge is the most significant structure on the A3. Currently, there are 21 exits and 18 rest areas operating along the route. A large part of the motorway is tolled using a ticket system; one section uses an open toll collection system. The Zagreb bypass sections are not tolled. The toll is charged according to vehicle classification in Croatia. The A3 motorway is operated by Hrvatske autoceste.

Construction of the six-lane motorway began in 1977, initially as the Zagreb bypass, then continued in the 1980s as an expansion of the existing two-lane road between Zagreb and Belgrade. The construction was suspended in the first part of the 1990s, due to the Croatian War of Independence, and resumed in 1996. Construction of the entire route was completed in 2006; further development entails new exits, new rest areas and the reconstruction of the existing motorway. The construction cost of the A3 motorway is estimated at 7 billion Croatian kuna (approximately 958.9 million euro).

== Route description ==
The A3 motorway (Croatian: Autocesta A3) is a major east–west motorway in Croatia connecting the capital of the country, Zagreb, to the Slavonia region, where the motorway follows a route parallel to the Sava River and further on to Serbian and Slovenian motorway networks. As a part of the road network of Croatia, it represents a part of European route E70 Bordeaux–Turin–Ljubljana–Zagreb–Belgrade–Bucharest. The motorway has facilitated accelerated economic development in the regions it connects. The motorway also connects to a number of other motorways in Croatia (from the west to the east): the A2 at the Jankomir interchange, the A1 at Lučko interchange, the A11 at Jakuševec, the A4 at Ivanja Reka and the A5 at the Sredanci interchange.

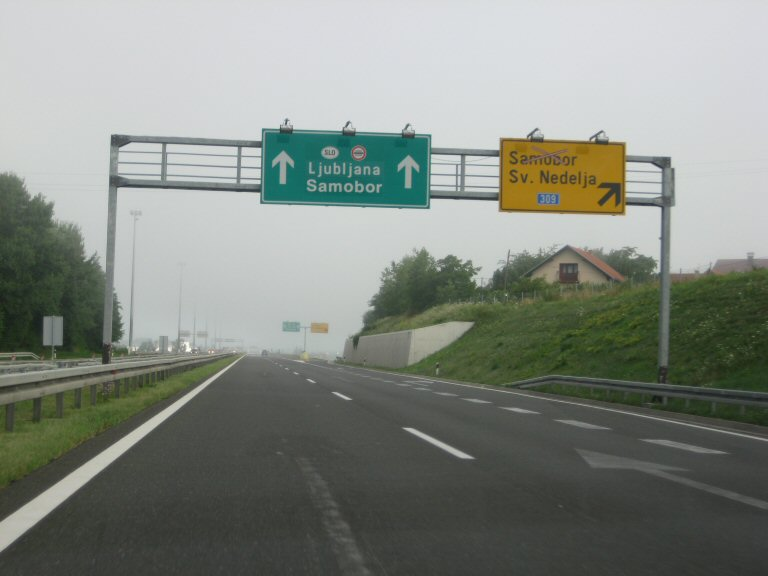
The A3 motorway Samobor exit

The motorway spans 306.5 kilometres (190.5 mi) between the Bregana border crossing, located near Samobor, to Slovenia and the Bajakovo border crossing to Serbia, east of Županja. It represents the shortest and the most comfortable transit traffic route between Slovenia, northern Italy, Austria, Switzerland, and southern Germany to the west; and Serbia, Bosnia and Herzegovina, Bulgaria, North Macedonia, Greece, and Turkey to the east. The route serves Sisak via the D36; Banja Luka, Bosnia and Herzegovina via the D5 and Stara Gradiška border crossing; Osijek via the A5; and Vinkovci via the D55. The A3 motorway route is complete since no extensions or alterations to the route are planned by applicable legislation.

The A3 motorway consists of two traffic lanes and an emergency lane in each driving direction along its entire length. As of September 2010, the motorway has 21 interchanges, providing access to numerous towns and cities and the Croatian state road network. Almost all of the existing interchanges are trumpet interchanges, except for Lučko, which is a stack interchange, and Jankomir, Kosnica, Ivanja Reka and Sredanci, which are cloverleaf interchanges. The motorway follows Pan-European Corridor X, and forms junctions with Pan-European Corridors Vb and Vc within Croatia.

An automatic traffic monitoring and guidance system is in place along the motorway. It consists of measuring, control and signaling devices, located in zones where driving conditions may vary—at interchanges, near viaducts, bridges, and in zones where fog is known to occur. The system comprises variable traffic signs used to communicate changing driving conditions, possible restrictions and other information to motorway users.

There are numerous rest areas along the motorway, providing various types of services ranging from simple parking spaces and restrooms to filling stations, restaurants and motels. The A3 motorway is operated by Hrvatske autoceste, the state-owned company tasked with the management, construction, and maintenance of Croatian motorways.

== Zagreb suburban interchanges ==
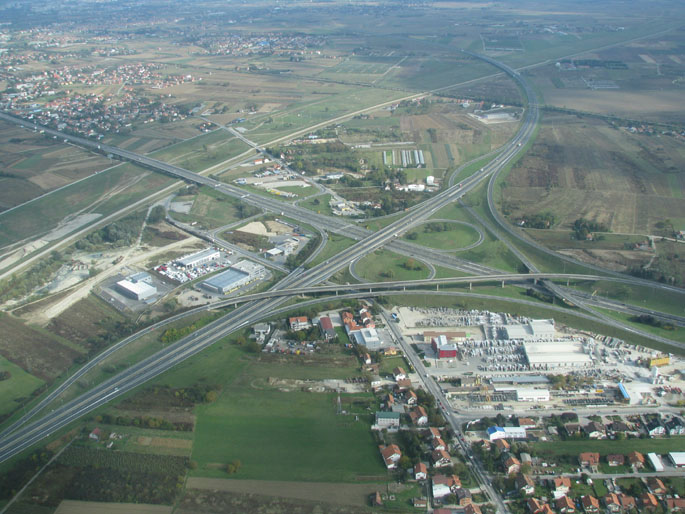
Lučko interchange

The route between Bobovica and Ivanja Reka interchanges (inclusive) serves as a part of Zagreb bypass, and it is therefore not tolled. The A3 section of the bypass also comprises junctions to a number of other motorways: the A1 at the Lučko interchange, the A2 at the Jankomir interchange, the A11 motorway at the Jakuševec interchange, and the A4 at the Ivanja Reka interchange. Two interchanges east of Zagreb, Rugvica and Križ, have recently been built to fill in 20-kilometre (12 mi) gaps between the Ivanja Reka, Ivanić-Grad and Popovača interchanges, respectively. Even though the sections east of Rugvica are not parts of Zagreb bypass proper (they are tolled), the area has recently shown a rise in the population as it comprises several Zagreb suburbs and commuter towns. The consequent increase of commuter traffic volume, overall increase of the motorway transit traffic and plans for construction of a Sava River port in Rugvica warranted construction of the additional interchanges.

The A3 section of Zagreb bypass is currently the busiest section of the Croatian motorway network, with annual average daily traffic (AADT) volume exceeding 40,000 vehicles, leading to congestion of the six-lane bypass at peak hours, especially during the summer, when tourist traffic adds to the congestion. The mainline toll plazas at Bobovica and Ivanja Reka can both become bottlenecks at such times. The alternative to the bypass is going through the city via Ljubljanska, Zagrebačka and Slavonska avenues. Despite being a shorter and a more direct route, those avenues are much more congested than the bypass at rush hours and they contain at-grade intersections and traffic lights at some of their junctions.

== Toll ==
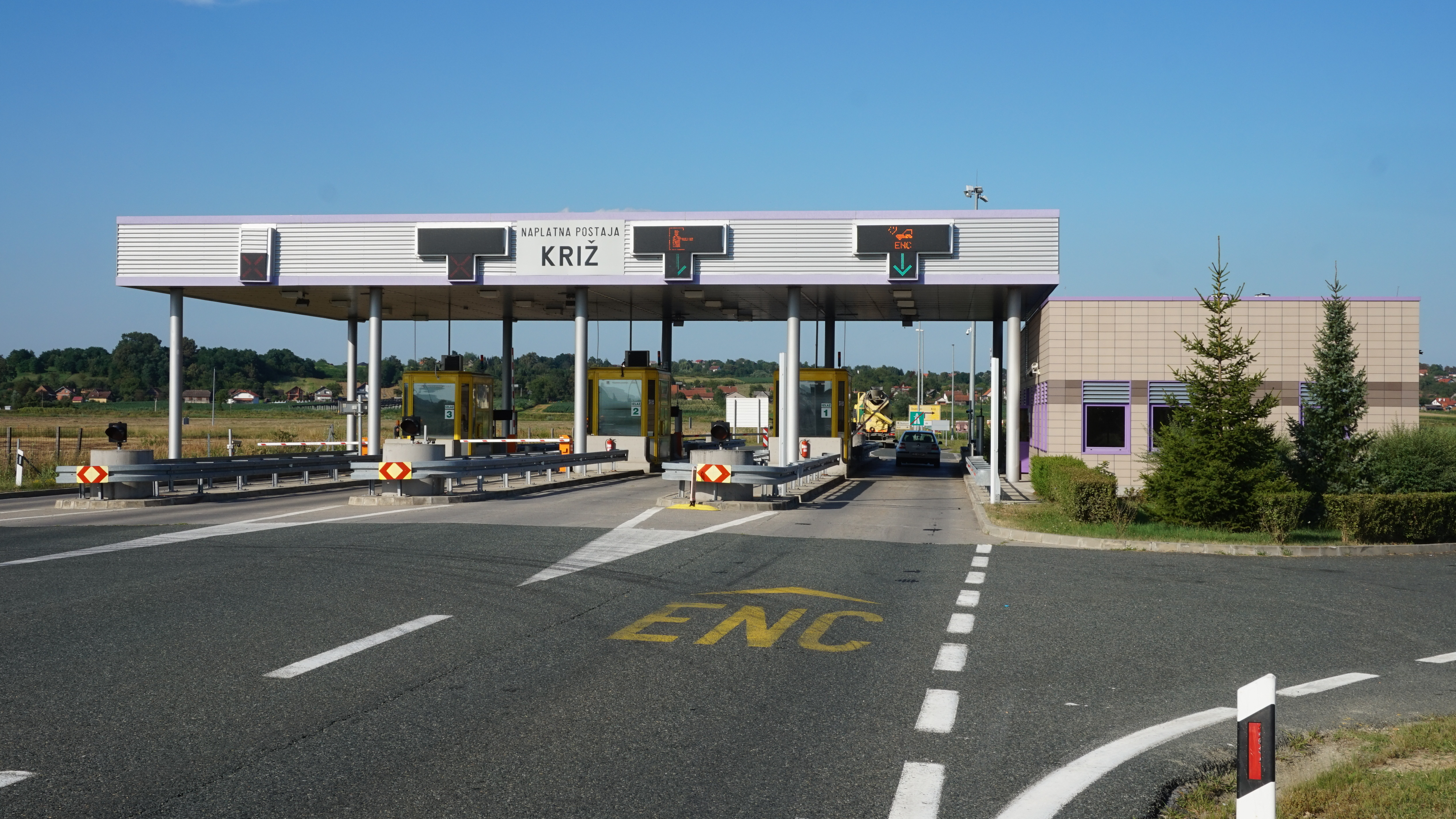
Križ toll plaza

The A3 is a partially tolled motorway based on the vehicle classification in Croatia. The westernmost section of the motorway, spanning the Bobovica interchange and the Bregana border crossing, is tolled at Bregana toll plaza using an open toll collection system; the motorway sections east of Ivanja Reka interchange are tolled using a closed toll collection system, integrated with the A5 motorway as the two connect at the Sredanci interchange, forming a unified toll collection system. As of October 2010, Bregana toll plaza charges 5.00 kuna (0.68 euro) to passenger cars and 20.00 kuna (2.74 euro) to semi-trailer trucks. The toll charged along the A3 route between Ivanja Reka and Lipovac varies depending on the distance travelled and ranges from 3.00 kuna (0.41 euro) to 105.00 kuna (14.38 euro) for passenger cars and 10.00 kuna (1.37 euro) to 350.00 kuna (47.95 euro) for semi-trailer trucks. The toll is payable in either Croatian kuna or euros and by major credit cards, debit cards and a number of prepaid toll collection systems, including various types of smart cards issued by the motorway operator and ENC—an electronic toll collection (ETC) system which is shared at most motorways in Croatia and provides drivers with discounted toll rates for dedicated lanes at toll plazas.

The toll collected by Hrvatske autoceste along the A3 motorway from January to August 2009 was reported to comprise the largest proportion of the total toll revenue collected by the company for the period: 889.8 million kuna (approximately 121.9 million euro). Even though this figure is not further decomposed into the individual sections of motorway, it is clear from the traffic volume data analysis that the largest portion of the toll revenue is collected on the sections between Zagreb and Slavonski Brod, and especially on those sections closest to the Ivanja Reka interchange.

Summertime and holiday queues at the Ivanja Reka mainline toll plaza can be considerable, a problem exacerbated during the usual weekend-to-weekend tourist stays at Croatia's coastal resorts. In such conditions, motorway users are advised to use the Rugvica and Ivanić Grad exits ahead of the Ivanja Reka interchange to avoid the queues. As of October 2010, the westbound transit traffic approaching the Ivanja Reka interchange must exit the tolled motorway network, since the existing Zagreb bypass is not tolled, and then re-enter another tolled motorway. There are plans for the outer Zagreb bypass to be integrated into the tolled motorway network as the ultimate solution for congestion at the Ivanja Reka toll plaza. That will require reconstruction of the Ivanić Grad interchange east of the Ivanja Reka toll plaza.

== History ==
=== Brotherhood and Unity Highway ===
A modern highway connecting Zagreb and Belgrade was originally designed in the late 1940s, and construction began on April 1, 1948. A substantial portion of the work was carried out by youth from Yugoslavia and abroad through youth work actions. Nearly 300,000 youth, including Yugoslav army soldiers, took part in the construction. The 382-kilometre (237 mi) road spanning the two cities, called Brotherhood and Unity Highway before the 1990s, was completed and officially opened on July 27, 1950. Despite being called a motorway (Croatian: autocesta), it was a single carriageway, two-lane road with all of its intersections at-grade. Due to a shortage of construction material, the wearing course was executed in various materials—mostly concrete slabs, with some asphalt concrete sections and even some cobblestone-covered sections.

The road was originally designed to carry approximately 9,000 vehicles per day, and the original construction plans provided for subsequent conversion of the road into a four-lane motorway. In 1971, as the road gradually became congested, the plans to build the motorway on the route were approved by the Parliament of the Socialist Republic of Croatia. Unlike the other two motorway plans approved by the Croatian government, Zagreb–Split and Zagreb–Rijeka, which were cancelled after the suppression of the Croatian Spring, the Zagreb–Belgrade motorway plans remained in place and an expansion of the existing motorway into a dual-carriageway, six-lane motorway with exclusively grade-separated intersections proceeded. The additional carriageway was to be built south of the existing road, which was in turn to be widened to accommodate two traffic lanes and an emergency lane.

=== Prewar construction and wartime use ===
Construction of the A3 motorway in Croatia in its present form started in 1977, when the first six-lane (including emergency lanes) sections were constructed as a part of the Zagreb bypass. In 1979, the 5.85-kilometre (3.64 mi) section connecting the Jankomir and Lučko interchanges was the first to be completed. The 22.15-kilometre (13.76 mi) section between the Lučko and Ivanja Reka interchanges was opened in 1981, marking the completion of the A3 section of the Zagreb bypass. Unlike the remainder of the motorway, which was constructed by widening the existing road and adding the additional carriageway, these two sections were built entirely from scratch.

The first part of the six-lane motorway to be completed east of Zagreb was the 76.52-kilometre (47.55 mi) section between Ivanja Reka and Lipovljani, immediately to the east of the present day Lipovljani rest area; this was done in 1980. In order to maintain the flow of traffic on the Zagreb–Belgrade road during construction, the southern carriageway was completed first, and then the two-way traffic was rerouted to the new carriageway while the old, northern carriageway was widened and its pavement structure was replaced with a new one. Similarly, as the new carriageway extended further eastward, the at-grade intersections were replaced by interchanges or flyovers. In 1985, the motorway was extended by 35.82 kilometres (22.26 mi) to Okučani, and in 1986 by another 7.50 kilometres (4.66 mi) to Prvča, near Nova Gradiška. Two further extensions of the motorway happened in 1988 and 1989—those were a 40.56-kilometre (25.20 mi) extension to Brodski Stupnik and another 8.80-kilometre (5.47 mi) one to Slavonski Brod and the present-day Slavonski Brod zapad (west) interchange. In 1991, the motorway reached beyond Slavonski Brod as it was extended once more by 11.40 kilometres (7.08 mi), to the Slavonski Brod istok (east) interchange.

Further construction of the motorway was suspended by the onset of the Croatian War of Independence. In October 1991, a part of the motorway between Novska and Nova Gradiška became inaccessible to the government of the Republic of Croatia due to military occupation of the area by the forces of the so-called SAO Western Slavonia. Consequently, the Novska–Nova Gradiška section was closed to all traffic. On December 21, 1994, negotiations led to the reopening of that section for transit traffic. However, the section remained unsafe for use as intermittent violence continued until May 1995, when the area was overrun by the Croatian army. Inspection of the motorway section carried out at the time revealed damage to a viaduct carrying the motorway over the Zagreb–Sisak–Vinkovci railroad and a local road near Novska. Besides the overall lack of maintenance during the period, the pavement and a number of flyovers were damaged by artillery bombardments, and the flyover approach embankments were damaged where trenches were dug.

=== Postwar reconstruction and completion ===
After the war, construction and reconstruction work resumed on the A3 motorway. The battle damage was the first to be addressed, along with removal of the trenches excavated in the flyover embankments. Similarly, unexploded ordnance and minefields left around the motorway had to be removed by minesweepers. The motorway pavement was seriously deteriorated, as evidenced by extensive ruts and cracks incurred during the four-year wartime period. Unlike repairs made to the viaducts and flyovers, mine clearance and pavement reconstruction took considerably more time to perform.

In 1996, the motorway was extended for the first time after the war. This 10.90-kilometre (6.77 mi) extension reached to Oprisavci, west of the present-day Sredanci interchange. In 1999, another 16.90-kilometre (10.50 mi) section was completed, stretching to Velika Kopanica. The single westward extension of the motorway came about in 2002 as the A3 motorway was extended 13.67 kilometres (8.49 mi) from Jankomir westward to the Bregana border crossing into Slovenia. The eastward advance of the A3 motorway continued in 2002, as it was extended by 25.95 kilometres (16.12 mi) to Županja, while the easternmost 30.42-kilometre (18.90 mi) section between Županja and the Bajakovo border crossing into Serbia was opened in 2006, thus completing the six-lane A3 motorway. The D4 state road was thus entirely replaced by the A3 motorway. The total investment value of the A3 motorway construction is estimated at 7 billion Croatian kuna (approximately 958.9 million euro), making the A3 the least expensive motorway in Croatia.

== Further construction ==
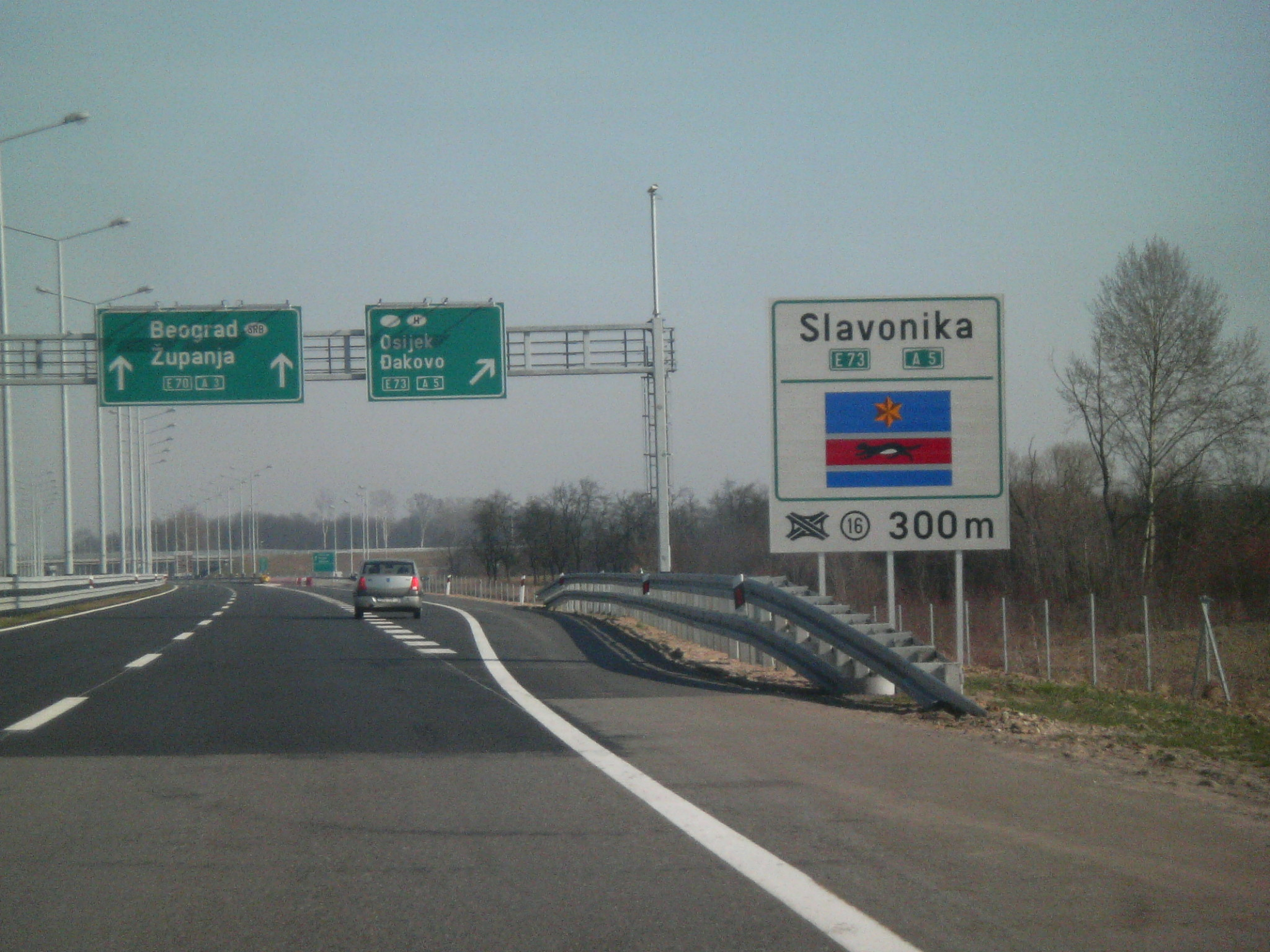
Approach to Sredanci interchange

Since the A3 motorway was completed in 2006, further construction on the A3 only consists of the addition of interchanges and rest areas.

The Kosnica interchange, itself completed in May 2007, lacked access ramps to the south, to the D31 state road, which were in turn completed in November 2013.

The latest new A3 interchange, the Jakuševec interchange on the Zagreb bypass, is a cloverleaf interchange connecting the A3 to the A11 motorway and in the future the city of Zagreb via Sarajevska road. The interchange itself and the access ramps to the A11 were completed in November 2015. Further construction towards Sarajevska road is planned.

As of 2016, two additional A3 interchanges are in various stages of construction or planning: Sveta Klara and Ivanić Grad. The Sveta Klara interchange is planned to provide another connection to the city of Zagreb (via Većeslava Holjevca Avenue). The interchange is designed as a trumpet. When both the Jakuševec and Sveta Klara interchanges are completed, the Buzin interchange was scheduled to be removed.

The present Ivanić Grad interchange connects the D43 state road to the A3 motorway near the city of Ivanić Grad, however, the interchange was scheduled to be reconstructed to accommodate a new motorway planned as an outer, tolled Zagreb bypass. The reconstruction is currently in the planning stages. Two further interchanges are planned: (1) Godinjak, to be located between the existing Nova Gradiška and Lužani interchanges, connecting to Požega; and (2) Lipovljani, located between the existing Kutina and Novska interchanges. These are included in applicable spatial planning documents and their designs are in development, however funding is yet to be secured. Finally, the Andautonija rest area is planned for the A3 section of the Zagreb bypass between the Jakuševec and Kosnica interchanges. It is planned to be an "A-type" rest area, which normally comprises a filling station, a restaurant and a motel.

== Traffic volume ==
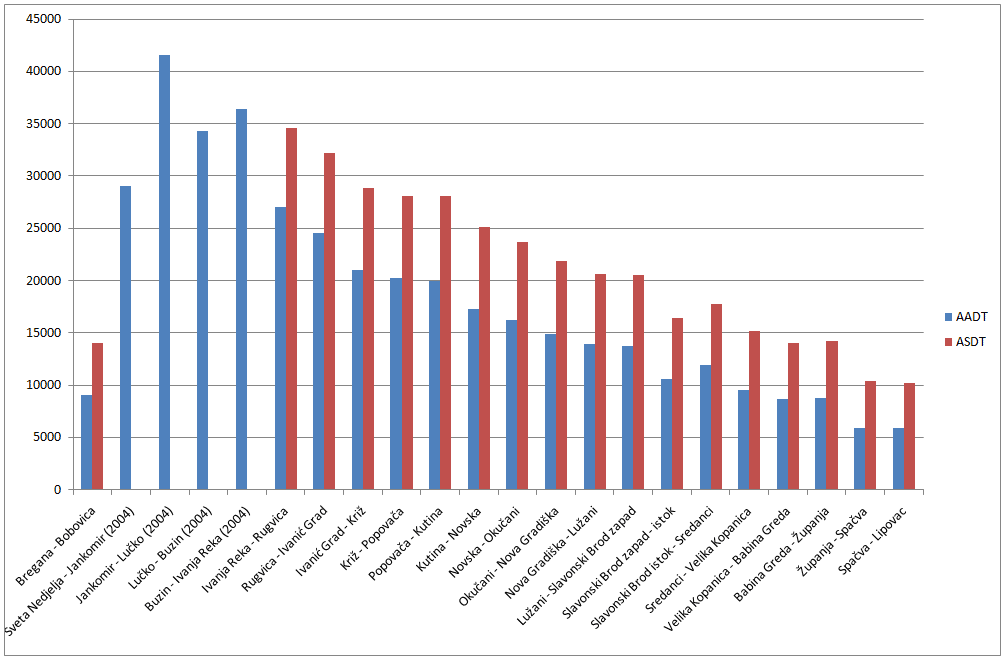
A3 motorway traffic volume (2009, except where noted otherwise)

Traffic is regularly counted by means of a traffic census at toll stations and reported by Hrvatske autoceste. The reported traffic volume gradually decreases as the motorway chainage increases and as it passes by various major destinations and the interchanges that serve them. Thus the greatest volume of traffic is registered along Zagreb bypass, especially the Jankomir–Lučko section, with 41,549 vehicle annual average daily traffic (AADT). The busiest tolled section of the motorway is Ivanja Reka–Rugvica with 27,049 AADT and 34,543 vehicle average summer daily traffic (ASDT) figures. The traffic volume gradually decreases from that section eastward to the eastern terminus of the motorway, where the lowest AADT and ASDT figures are recorded. The traffic volume decrease is somewhat more pronounced at interchanges serving Slavonski Brod and the A5 motorway (Sredanci). The seasonal traffic volume variation ranges from a 28% increase on the busiest, Ivanja Reka–Rugvica, section to a 75% volume increase, as measured on the Županja–Spačva section. Average summer season traffic volume increase on the motorway is 55%. The AADT/ASDT ratio analysis does not include Zagreb bypass, as there are no ASDT data available for the bypass.

A3 traffic volume details
Road	Counting site	AADT	ASDT	Section
A3	1910 Bobovica - west	9,046	14,065	Bregana border crossing–Bobovica
A3	1909 Bregana	9,444*	14,786*	Bregana toll plaza–Bobovica; Estimates by Hrvatske ceste
A3	-	29,035	—N/a	Sveta Nedjelja–Jankomir (2004)
A3	-	41,549	—N/a	Jankomir–Lučko (2004)
A3	-	34,281	—N/a	Lučko–Buzin (2004)
A3	-	36,393	—N/a	Buzin–Ivanja Reka (2004)
A3	2013 Ivanja Reka - east	27,046	34,543	Ivanja Reka–Rugvica
A3	2027 Rugvica - east	24,508	32,159	Rugvica–Ivanić Grad
A3	2114 Ivanić Grad - east	21,055	28,861	Ivanić Grad–Križ
A3	2121 Križ - east	20,215	28,061	Križ–Popovača
A3	2118 Popovača - east	19,973	28,090	Popovača–Kutina
A3	3302 Kutina - east	17,286	25,113	Kutina–Novska
A3	3405 Novska - east	16,187	23,710	Novska–Okučani
A3	3407 Okučani - east	14,924	21,911	Okučani–Nova Gradiška
A3	3510 Nova Gradiška - east	13,888	20,667	Nova Gradiška–Lužani
A3	3514 Lužani - east	13,770	20,515	Lužani–Slavonski Brod zapad (west)
A3	3511 Slavonski Brod zapad (west) - east	10,581	16,464	Slavonski Brod zapad (west)–Slavonski Brod istok (east)
A3	3609 Slavonski Brod istok (east) - east	11,888	17,742	Slavonski Brod istok (east)–Sredanci
A3	3617 Sredanci - east	9,571	15,183	Sredanci–Velika Kopanica
A3	3613 Velika Kopanica - east	8,675	14,049	Velika Kopanica–Babina Greda
A3	3714 Babina Greda - east	8,772	14,190	Babina Greda–Županja
A3	3716 Županja - east	5,925	10,350	Županja–Spačva
A3	3807 Spačva - east	5,865	10,266	Spačva–Lipovac

== Rest areas ==
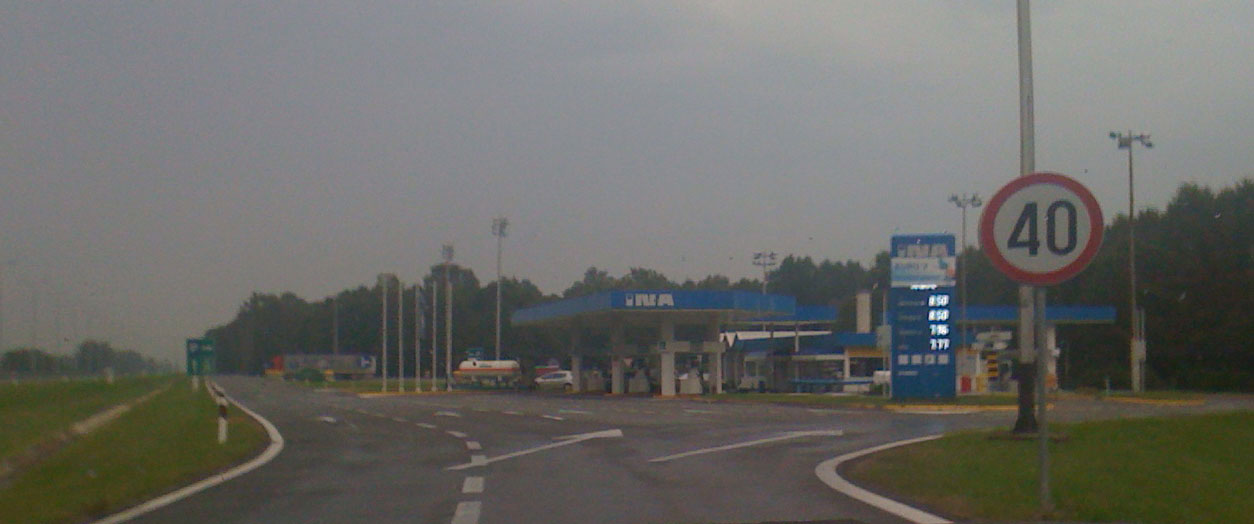
Novska rest area

As of October 2010, there are 18 rest areas operating along the A3 motorway, and additional rest areas are planned along the existing sections of the route. Legislation provides for four types of rest areas, designated as types A through D. A-type rest areas comprise a full range of amenities, including a filling station, a restaurant and a hotel or a motel; B-type rest areas have no lodging; C-type rest areas are very common and include a filling station and a café, but no restaurants or accommodations; D-type rest areas offer parking spaces only, possibly some picnicking tables, benches and restrooms. Even though the rest areas found along the A3 motorway generally follow this ranking system, there are considerable variations, as some of them offer extra services. The filling stations regularly have small convenience stores and some of them offer LPG fuel.

The primary motorway operator, Hrvatske autoceste (HAC), leases the A, B and C type rest areas to various operators through public tenders. As of October 2010, there are three such rest area operators on the A3 motorway: INA, Nafta Promet and INA Osijek Petrol. The rest area operators are not permitted to sub-lease the fuel operations. Most of the A3 motorway rest areas are accessible to both directions of traffic. There are however rest areas which are available only to the eastbound traffic (e.g. Lužani and Brodski Stupnik rest areas) or to westbound traffic only, like Slaven and Staro Petrovo Selo rest areas. Furthermore, some rest areas offer different types of amenities to each direction of the traffic. The rest areas normally operate 24 hours per day, 7 days per week, except Stari Hrastovi (eastbound) rest area, which is open from 7 am to 6 pm.

List of A3 motorway rest areas
County	km	Name	Operators	Notes
Zagreb County	4.2	Gradna	INA	Facilities found at the Gradna rest area comprise a filling station selling petrol, diesel fuel and LPG, a café and restrooms.
City of Zagreb	17.1	Zagreb	INA	Facilities found at the Lučko rest area comprise a filling station selling petrol and diesel fuel, a café, a motel, an RV park, picnicking tables and restrooms.
Zagreb County	54.8	Ježevo	INA; McDonald's	Facilities found at the Ježevo rest area comprise a filling station selling petrol, diesel fuel and LPG, a motel, a restaurant, a café and restrooms. The motel and the restaurant are accessible to the eastbound traffic only.
Zagreb County	77.1	Novoselec	INA	Facilities found at the Križ rest area comprise a filling station selling petrol and diesel fuel, a motel, a restaurant, a café, picnicking tables and restrooms. The motel and the restaurant are accessible to the eastbound traffic only.
Sisak-Moslavina	96.2	Gračenica	Tifon	Facilities found at the Gračenica rest area comprise a filling station selling petrol and diesel fuel, a motel, a restaurant, a café, picnicking tables and restrooms. The filling station is available to both traffic directions, but all other facilities are available to the westbound traffic only.
Sisak-Moslavina	116.5	Kraljeva Velika	INA	Facilities found at the Kraljeva Velika rest area comprise a filling station selling petrol and diesel fuel, a restaurant, a café, picnicking tables and restrooms. The picnicking tables are available to the eastbound traffic only.
Sisak-Moslavina	133.1	Stari Grabovac	INA	Facilities found at the Novska rest area comprise a filling station selling petrol and diesel fuel, a café and restrooms.
Brod-Posavina	157.6	Dragalić	Crodux; McDonald's	Facilities found at the Nova Gradiška rest area comprise a restaurant, a café and restrooms. The facilities are available to the eastbound traffic only. Only a parking area is available to the westbound traffic.
Brod-Posavina	164.8	Slaven	INA	Facilities found at the Slaven rest area comprise a filling station selling petrol and diesel fuel, a motel, a restaurant, a café, picnicking tables and restrooms. The rest area is available to the westbound traffic only.
Brod-Posavina	175.5	Staro Petrovo Selo	INA	Facilities found at the Staro Petrovo Selo rest area comprise a filling station selling petrol and diesel fuel, a motel, a restaurant and restrooms. The rest area is available to the westbound traffic only.
Brod-Posavina	191.6	Lužani	Lukoil; Nafta Promet	Facilities found at the Lužani rest area comprise a filling station selling petrol and diesel fuel, a motel, a restaurant and restrooms. The rest area is available to the eastbound traffic only.
Brod-Posavina	201.4	Brodski Stupnik	Nafta Promet	Facilities found at the Brodski Stupnik rest area comprise a filling station selling petrol and diesel fuel, a café and restrooms. The rest area is available to the eastbound traffic only.
Brod-Posavina	216.5	Marsonija	INA	Facilities found at the Marsonija rest area comprise a filling station selling petrol, diesel fuel and LPG and restrooms. The LPG filling station is available to the eastbound traffic only, while the restrooms are available to the westbound traffic only.
Brod-Posavina	238.4	Sredanci	INA	Facilities found at the Sredanci rest area comprise a filling station selling petrol and diesel fuel, a restaurant, a café and restrooms. The facilities are available to the eastbound traffic only. Only a parking area is available to the westbound traffic.
Vukovar-Srijem	258.7	Sava	INA Osijek Petrol	Facilities found at the Babina Greda rest area comprise a filling station selling petrol and diesel fuel, a café and restrooms. The facilities are available to the eastbound traffic only. Only a parking area is available to the westbound traffic.
Vukovar-Srijem	271.3	Rastovica	INA	Facilities found at the Rastovica rest area comprise a filling station selling petrol and diesel fuel, a café and restrooms. The facilities are available to the westbound traffic only. Only a parking area is available to the eastbound traffic.
Vukovar-Srijem	283.1	Bošnjaci	HAC	Facilities found at the Bošnjaci rest area comprise picnicking tables and restrooms.
Vukovar-Srijem	298.4	Spačvanska šuma	INA	Facilities found at the Spačva rest area comprise a motel, a restaurant and restrooms.
1.000 mi = 1.609 km; 1.000 km = 0.621 mi: Incomplete access

== Exit list ==
These are the exits on the A3 motorway, including those under construction.

County	km	Exit	Name	Destination	Notes
Zagreb County	0.0	Border crossing within the EU	Bregana border crossing	A2 E70	Border crossing to Slovenia. The motorway extends as Slovenian A2 motorway. The western terminus of the motorway and the western terminus of European route E70 concurrency.
Zagreb County	1.0	Toll plaza traffic sign	Bregana toll plaza		
Zagreb County	2.5	1	Samobor		Links Samobor, Bregana and Žumberak nature park
Zagreb County	4.2	Rest area traffic sign	Gradna rest area		
Zagreb County	8.8	2	Sveta Nedjelja	D231	Links Samobor and Sveta Nedjelja
Zagreb County		3	Rakitje	Ž3064	Link to Rakitje
City of Zagreb	14.6	4	Zagreb zapad	A2 D1 E59 Ž1035	Connection to A2 motorway and to the City of Zagreb via Ljubljanska Avenue. The western terminus of the D1 state road concurrency; the D1 is not signposted along the A3.
City of Zagreb	17.1	Rest area traffic sign	Zagreb rest area		
City of Zagreb	19.5	5	Lučko	A1 D1 D3 E65 E71 Ž1040	Connection to A1 motorway and to the City of Zagreb via Jadranska Avenue. The western terminus of European routes E65/E71 concurrency. The eastern terminus of the D1 state road concurrency and the western terminus of D3 state road concurrency; the state roads are not signposted along the A3.
City of Zagreb	26.2		Sveta Klara	L10100	A planned connection to the City of Zagreb via Novi Zagreb and Većeslava Holjevca Avenue
City of Zagreb	27.3	6	Buzin	D30 Ž1038	Connection to the City of Zagreb via Savezne Republike Njemačke Street and Novi Zagreb, Zagreb airport and to Velika Gorica
City of Zagreb	28.3	7	Jakuševec	A11 Ž1039	Interchange to the A11 motorway, providing connection to Velika Gorica and in the future to Zagreb via Sarajevska Road.
Zagreb County	35.5	8	Kosnica	D30 Ž1029	Connection to the City of Zagreb via Radnička Road (Ž1029 to the north) and to Velika Gorica and Zagreb Airport (D30 to the south)
Zagreb County	39.6	Sava River Bridge			
Zagreb County	40.3	9	Zagreb istok	A4 D3 E65 E71 Ž1035	Connection to A4 motorway and the City of Zagreb via Slavonska Avenue. The eastern terminus of European routes E65/E71 concurrency. The eastern terminus of D3 state road concurrency; the D3 is not signposted along the A3.
Zagreb County		10	Otok Svibovski	Ž1036	Connection to Otok Svibovski, Dumovec, Zagreb-east Business Zone and IKEA Zagreb
Zagreb County	48.7	11	Rugvica	D43 Ž3070	Connection to Dugo Selo and Rugvica
Zagreb County		Toll plaza traffic sign	Zagreb-east toll plaza		
Zagreb County	54.8	Rest area traffic sign	Ježevo rest area		
Zagreb County	65.3	12	Ivanić Grad	D43	Connection to Ivanić Grad and Čazma
Zagreb County	74.6	13	Križ		Connection to Križ
Zagreb County	77.1	Rest area traffic sign	Novoselec rest area		
Sisak-Moslavina	88.2	14	Popovača	D36 Ž3159	Connection to Popovača, Sisak and Lonjsko polje nature park
Sisak-Moslavina	96.2	Rest area traffic sign	Gračenica rest area		
Sisak-Moslavina	105.9	15	Kutina	D45	Connection to Kutina and Garešnica
Sisak-Moslavina	116.5	Rest area traffic sign	Kraljeva Velika rest area		
Sisak-Moslavina		16	Lipovljani		Connection to Lipovljani
Sisak-Moslavina	127.1	17	Novska	D47	Connection to Novska, Jasenovac and Lipik
Sisak-Moslavina	133.1	Rest area traffic sign	Stari Grabovac rest area		
Brod-Posavina	151.9	18	Okučani	D5 E661	Connection to Okučani, Pakrac, Lipik, Daruvar and Under constructions expressway in Banja Luka, Bosnia and Herzegovina
Brod-Posavina	157.6	Rest area traffic sign	Dragalić rest area		
Brod-Posavina	167.4	19	Nova Gradiška	D51	Connection to Nova Gradiška and Požega
Brod-Posavina		20	Požega		Planned connection to Požega
Brod-Posavina	175.5	Rest area traffic sign	Staro Petrovo Selo rest area		Accessible to westbound traffic only
Brod-Posavina	189.9	21	Lužani	D49	Connection to Lužani, Pleternica and Požega
Brod-Posavina	191.6	Rest area traffic sign	Lužani rest area		Accessible to eastbound traffic only
Brod-Posavina	201.4	Rest area traffic sign	Brodski Stupnik rest area		Accessible to eastbound traffic only
Brod-Posavina	211.1	22	Slavonski Brod zapad	D525	Western connection to Slavonski Brod
Brod-Posavina	216.5	Rest area traffic sign	Marsonija rest area		
Brod-Posavina	221.6	23	Slavonski Brod istok	D514	Eastern connection to Slavonski Brod
Brod-Posavina	238.4	Rest area traffic sign	Sredanci rest area		
Brod-Posavina	241.4	24	Sredanci	A5	Connection to A5 motorway
Brod-Posavina	249.2	25	Velika Kopanica	D7 E73	Connection to Velika Kopanica and Slavonski Šamac
Vukovar-Syrmia	258.7	Rest area traffic sign	Sava rest area		
Vukovar-Syrmia	261.8	26	Babina Greda	D520	Connection to Babina Greda and Slavonski Šamac.
Vukovar-Syrmia	271.3	Rest area traffic sign	Rastovica rest area		
Vukovar-Syrmia	274.0	27	Županja	D55	Connection to Županja, Vinkovci, Vukovar and Orašje, Bosnia and Herzegovina
Vukovar-Syrmia	283.1	Rest area traffic sign	Bošnjaci rest area		
Vukovar-Syrmia	291.2	28	Spačva	Ž4172	Connection to Vrbanja and Brčko, Bosnia and Herzegovina.
Vukovar-Syrmia	298.4	Rest area traffic sign	Spačvanska šuma rest area		
Vukovar-Syrmia	300.1	Toll plaza traffic sign	Lipovac toll plaza		
Vukovar-Syrmia	304.0	29	Lipovac	D57 Ž4234	Connection to Lipovac, Tovarnik, Vukovar and Ilok
Vukovar-Syrmia	306.5	Border crossing traffic sign	Bajakovo border crossing	A3 E70	Border crossing to Serbia. The route continues as Serbian motorway A3. The eastern terminus of the motorway and the eastern terminus of European route E70 concurrency.
1.000 mi = 1.609 km; 1.000 km = 0.621 mi: Concurrency terminus; Incomplete access; Unopened

== See also ==
- International E-road network
- Transport in Croatia
