= Slavonska Avenue =

Street in Zagreb, Croatia

Coordinates: 45°47′49″N 16°1′14″E

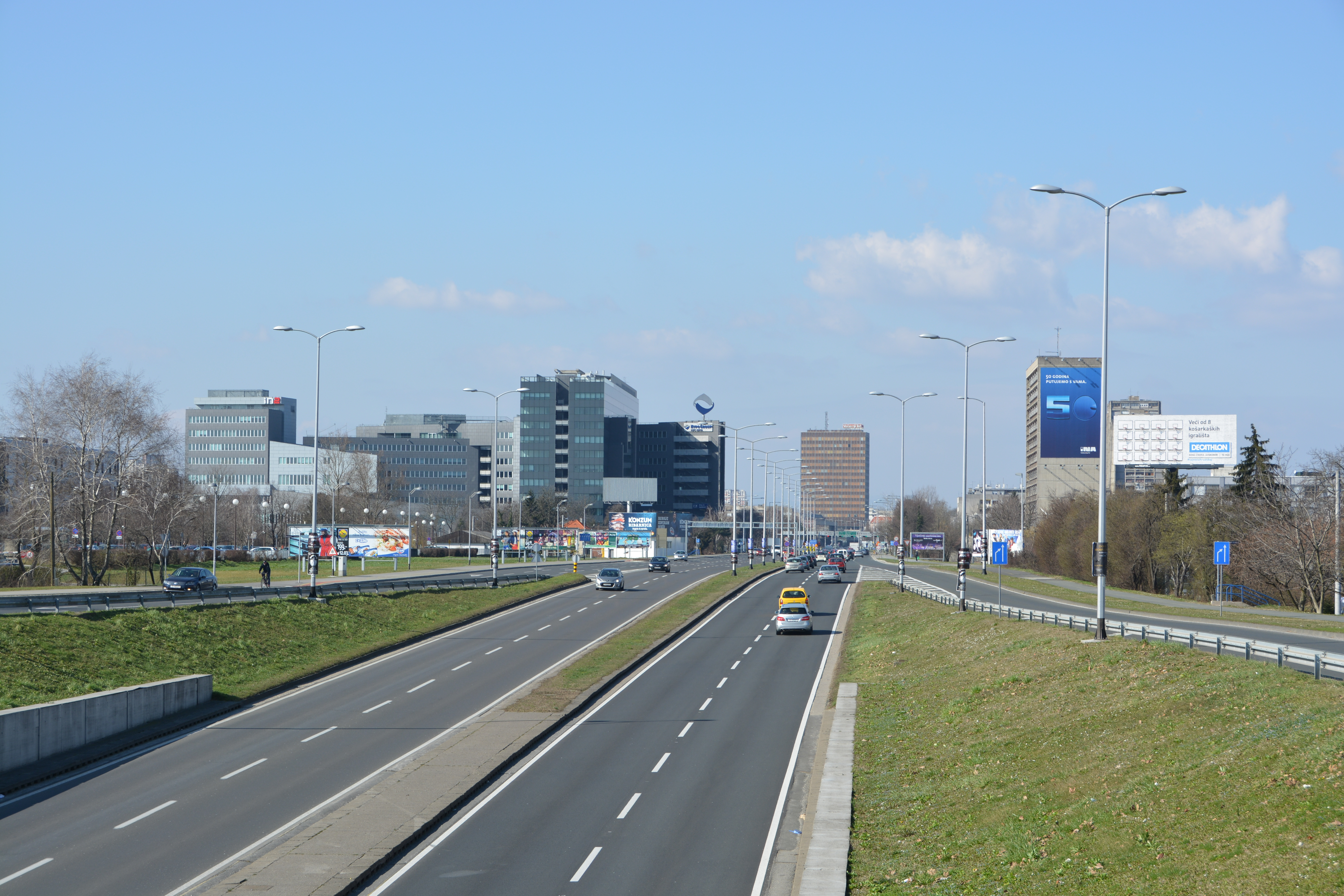
- Slavonska Avenue in Trnje
- Interactive map of Slavonska Avenue
- Native name: Slavonska avenija (Croatian)
- Former names: Highway of Brotherhood and Unity, Belgrade Avenue
- Length: 18 km (11 mi)
- Width: 4 lanes
- Location: Zagreb, Croatia
- Postal code: 10000

Slavonska Avenue (Croatian: Slavonska avenija) is a limited-access avenue in Zagreb, Croatia. It is the longest street in Zagreb, being 18 km (11 mi) long. It mostly has a 70 km/h (43 mph) speed limit, although the speed is limited to 100 km/h (62 mph) on a short section near the Ivanja Reka interchange with the Zagreb bypass. In 2007 the avenue was proclaimed to be the most accident-prone road in Zagreb. The avenue is an important east–west arterial road. Starting at the interchange with Savska Road, it intersects, featuring mainly two and three-level interchanges, several other main Zagreb thoroughfares (sorted eastbound): Croatian Fraternal Union Avenue, Marin Držić Avenue, Vjekoslav Heinzel Avenue, Gospić Road, Sesvete Ljudevit Posavski Road. Slavonska Avenue does not have any tram lines, although most lines in Zagreb pass over or under the avenue.

== History ==
Slavonska Avenue used to be a part of the ex-Yugoslav Highway "Bratstvo i jedinstvo" and as such it was divided into two different avenues: Brotherhood and Unity Avenue (Av. bratstva i jedinstva) and Beogradska Avenue (Beogradska avenija). The "Brotherhood and Unity" Avenue was the stretch between Savska Street and Marin Držić Avenue and the Beogradska Avenue was the part east of Marin Držić Avenue to Vjekoslav Heinzel Avenue. After the construction of Zagreb bypass, the definition of the avenue was expanded to the Ivanja Reka interchange.

After the Croatian War of Independence and the breakup of Yugoslavia, due to the ongoing hostility between Croats and Serbs, the Beogradska Avenue was renamed to Slavonska Avenue. The Brotherhood and Unity Avenue also became a part of Slavonska Avenue, since the naming was inconsistent with the political situation at that time.

== At-grade crossing problem ==
Since Slavonska Avenue is an important Zagreb arterial road, the presence of at-grade intersections with traffic lights slows down traffic, creating traffic jams during rush hours.

In particular, the at-grade intersections of Slavonska are:

- Cvjetno naselje / Vrbik
- Kruge / Savica
- Marijana Čavića Street (Ferenščica / Žitnjak)
- Vukomerec / Kozari Bok
- Čulinečka Street (Donja Dubrava / Resnik)
- Resnik
- Jelkovec / Ivanja Reka

In 2008, it was proposed to widen it to six lanes and replace the most problematic traffic light intersections with overpasses. As of 2010, it is known the intersection with Čavićeva is planned to be upgraded, while the Ljudevita Posavskog street intersection south of Sesvete has been changed into a grade-separated intersection in 2010.

A traffic fatality caused by the hazardous traffic light scheme on the Čavićeva street intersection in 2008 alarmed Mayor Bandić to speed up the procedure, but to little practical effect.

Many intersections with minor streets, particularly on the section between Držićeva and Heinzelova, were built as right-in/right-outs, having drivers on nearby interchanges and intersections change several traffic lanes in a very short distance, which results in weaving.

== See also ==
- Ljubljanska Avenue
- Zagrebačka Avenue
