= King Cross Jankomir =

Shopping centre in Zagreb, Croatia

Coordinates: 45.79661°N 15.85585°E

King Cross Jankomir is a shopping centre located in Zagreb, Croatia, on Velimir Škorpik Street 34 in the neighbourhood of Jankomir. It was financed by Coimpredil and Coop Consumatori Nordest and opened on 21 September 2002. The shopping centre has a gross area of 110,000 m^{2} (1,200,000 sq ft), 43,000 m^{2} (460,000 sq ft) of which is covered, and 29,000 m^{2} (310,000 sq ft) of retail space. At the time of its opening, it was the largest shopping centre in Croatia. The shopping centre cost €67 million to build, and its investors partly funded the upgrade of the adjoining road infrastructure.
