= Petina, Croatia =

Petina
- Village
- Location within Croatia
- Coordinates: 45°45′23.4″N 16°05′9.92″E
- Country: Croatia
- Region: Central Croatia
- County: Zagreb County
- Municipality: Velika Gorica

Area
  - Total: 1.3 km^{2} (0.50 sq mi)
- Elevation: 90 m (300 ft)

Population (2021)
  - Total: 193
  - Density: 150/km^{2} (380/sq mi)
- Time zone: UTC+1 (CET)
  - Summer (DST): UTC+2 (CEST)

Petina is a Croatian village belonging to the town and municipality of Velika Gorica, in Zagreb County. In 2011, its population was 213.

== Geography ==
The village is located north of Zagreb Airport and close to the city limits of Zagreb, near the Sava river. Its nearest villages are Velika Kosnica and Mala Kosnica. Petina is served by the A3 motorway at the exit "Kosnica".
