= Jankomir interchange =

- Croatian: Čvor Jankomir
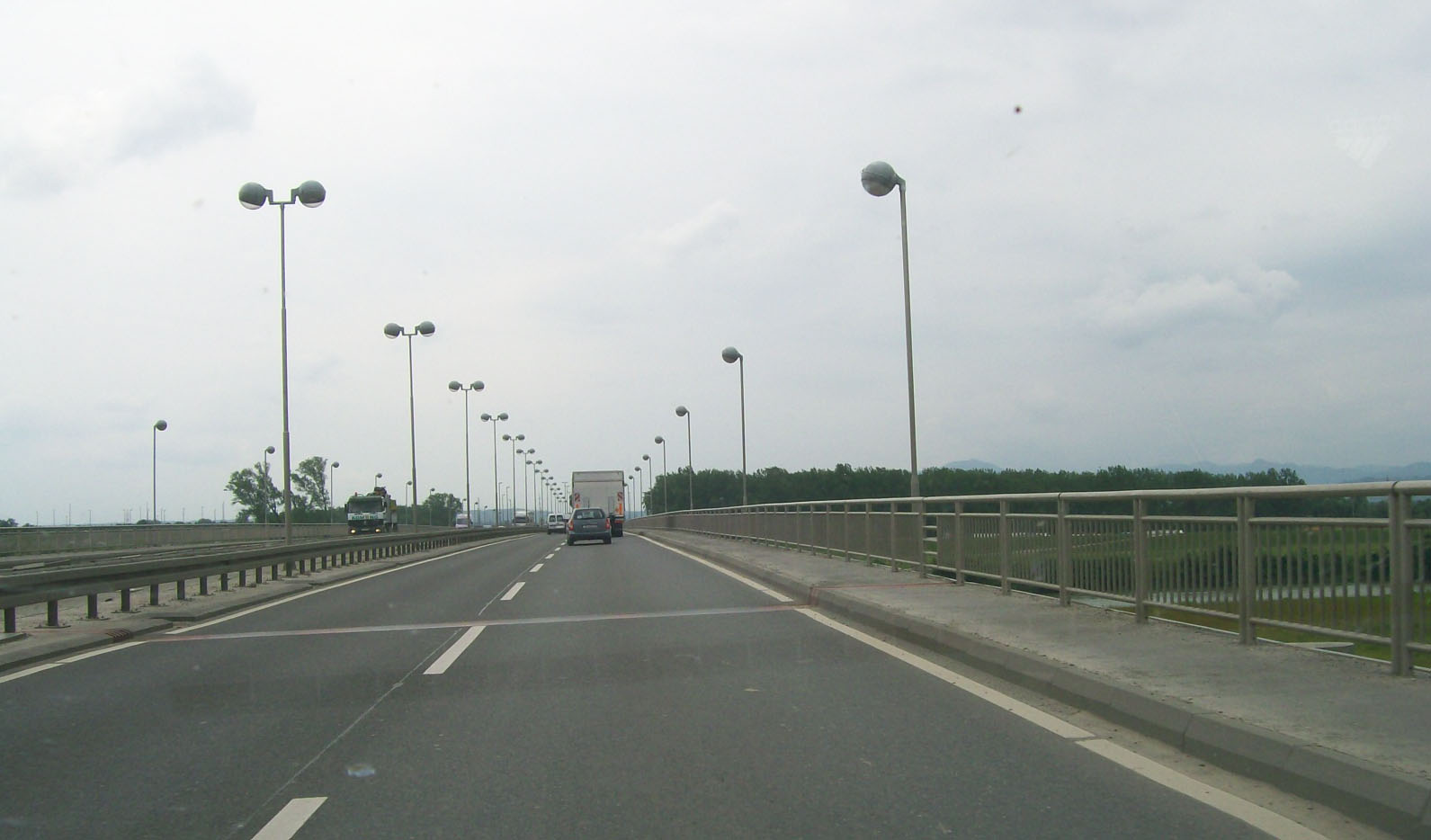
- Jankomir interchange, approach along the westbound Ž1035 via Jankomir Bridge

Location
- Zagreb, Croatia
- Coordinates: 45.789312°N 15.848894°E
- Roads at junction: A2; A3 D1 Ž1035

Construction
- Type: Cloverleaf interchange

The Jankomir interchange (Croatian: Čvor Jankomir) is a cloverleaf interchange west of Zagreb, Croatia. It is named after nearby Zagreb neighborhood of Jankomir. The interchange represents the southern terminus of the A2 motorway and it connects the A2 route to the A3 motorway representing a major link in the Croatian motorway system. The interchange is a part of Pan-European corridors X and Xa. It also represents a junction of European routes E59 and E70.

Construction of the interchange marked start of construction of the A3 motorway in its present form. In 1979, it became a part of the first six-lane (including emergency lanes) section, constructed as a part of the Zagreb bypass—5.85-kilometre (3.64 mi) section connecting the Jankomir and Lučko interchanges. At the time of construction, the interchange connected the new Zagreb bypass to former Brotherhood and Unity Highway which linked Zagreb to Slovenian border and a two-lane road to Krapina. The former was subsequently upgraded to become a part of the A3 motorway (west of the interchange) and Ž1035—four-lane connector to Zagreb, while the latter was upgraded and became the A2 motorway.

== See also ==
- International E-road network
- Transport in Croatia
