= Volovčica =

Neighborhood of Zagreb, Croatia

Coordinates: 45°48′27″N 16°01′22″E

- Interactive map of Volovčica

Volovčica is a neighbourhood in the southeast of Zagreb, Croatia, within the Peščenica – Žitnjak district. The area of the local city council of Volovčica has a population of 5,275 (census 2021).

The area is part of the new Peščenica settlement that started to be built in 1932.
