= Milan Radonjić =

Serbian tarot reader and TV personality

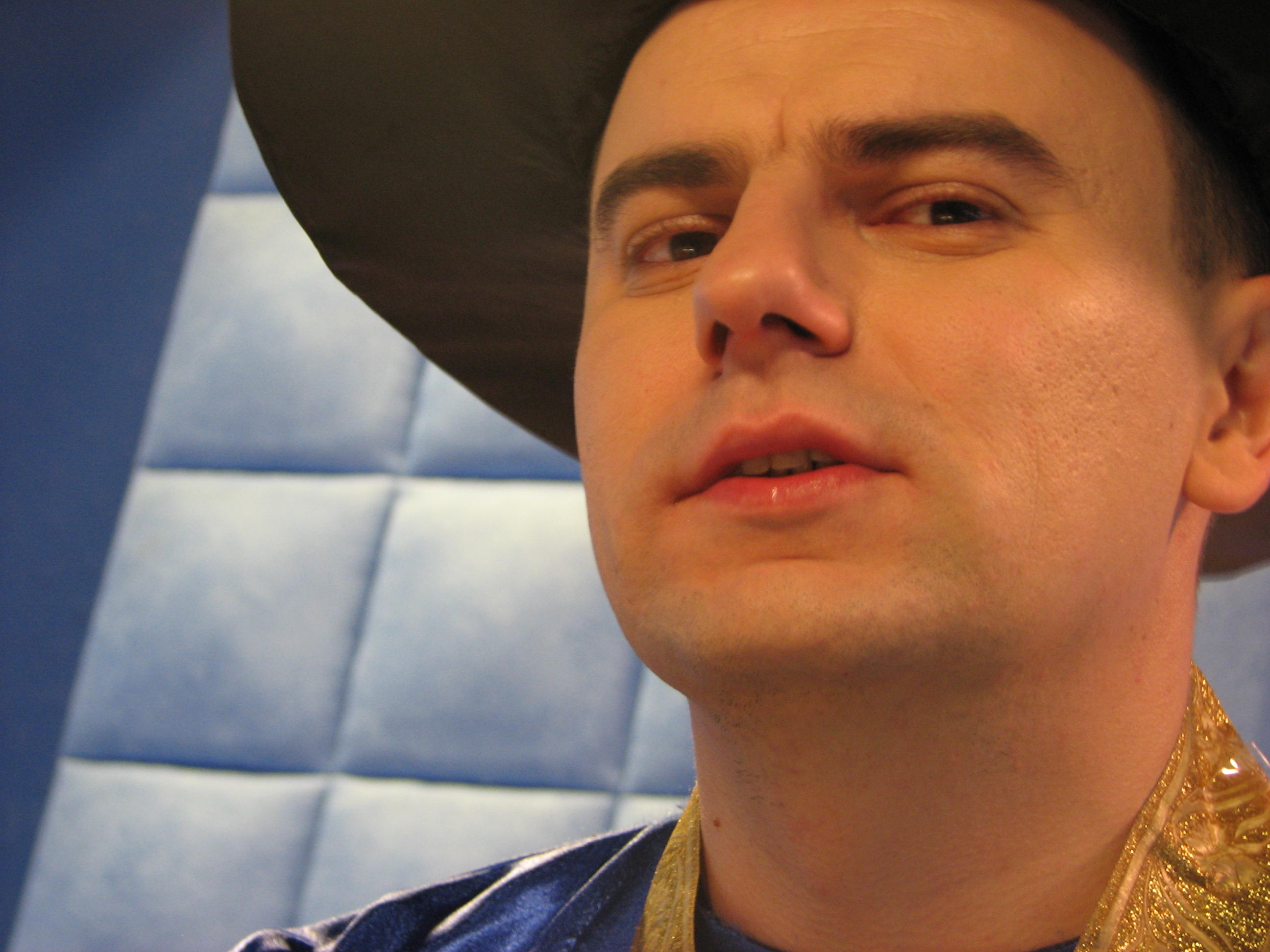
- Radonjić on Nova TV in 2009
- Born: Milan Radonjić; 11 April 1973 (age 53); Belgrade, SR Serbia, SFR Yugoslavia
- Other names: Milan Tarot, Vidoviti Milan
- Occupation: Internet celebrity/TV host
- Years active: 2005–present
- Website: milantarot.com

Milan Radonjić (Serbian Cyrillic: Милан Радоњић; born on 11 April 1973) is a known tarot card reader, psychic and TV personality in the Balkan region.

At first, after finishing high school, Radonjić worked late-night tarot shows on local TV stations in Serbia such as TV Duga and TV Palma Plus. After a series of video clips with Radonjić's predictions and advice, such as "You will get pregnant in seven days if you read Pinocchio every day" and "yelling Ninja! five times will cure diseases, emerged on the Internet, his shows gained considerable mainstream interest, including single and multiple page interviews in Jutarnji list, Večernji list and Blic.

Consequently, he started working at five television stations in Bosnia and Herzegovina, including nationwide OBN television based in Sarajevo, and a number of television stations in Croatia, including nationwide Nova TV based in Zagreb, first appeared on the show Nightmare Stage by Željko Malnar on Z1 TV. Allegedly, his contract with OBN TV is worth 780 thousand US dollars, but that, like most things Radonjić publicly claims, is doubtful.

He also stated he has bought YouTube and that Barack Obama and Bill Gates have consulted him for advice.
