= Donje Svetice =

Neighbourhood of Zagreb, Croatia

Coordinates: 45.80647°N 16.01365°E

- Interactive map of Donje Svetice

Donje Svetice (lit. 'Lower Svetice') is a neighbourhood in the southeast of Zagreb, Croatia, within the Peščenica – Žitnjak district. The area of the local city council of Donje Svetice has a population of 3,022 (census 2021).

The area is part of the new Peščenica settlement that started to be built in 1932, but grew particularly after World War II.

The area's central north-west thoroughfare is the eponymous Donje Svetice, continuing on the Svetice Street from Stara Peščenica in the north. The two streets are separated by an underpass under the M102 railway, connecting to the City of Vukovar Street in the south. The main east-west street through the neighbourhood is the Planinska Street.

The Faculty of Veterinary Medicine, University of Zagreb campus is located in the western part of the neighbourhood, by the Vjekoslav Heinzel Avenue, where it was first built in 1940. The NK HAŠK stadium grounds are located in the southeastern part. The Ministry of Science and Education building is located in central Donje Svetice since 2008.
