= Folnegovićevo naselje =

Neighbourhood of Zagreb, Croatia

- Interactive map of Folnegovićevo naselje
- Coordinates: 45.79353°N 16.00511°E

Folnegovićevo naselje is a neighbourhood in the southeast of Zagreb, Croatia, within the Peščenica – Žitnjak district. The area of the local city council of Folnegovićevo naselje has a population of 2,873 (census 2021).

The area of the local city council of "Janko Matko" has a population of 1,150 (census 2021).

The area started to be built largely after World War II.

The two local councils organize a yearly cultural manifestation 'Dani Folke' (Folka days, where Folka is a common name for the neighbourhood).
