= Pevec =

Pevec is a Slovenian surname literally meaning "singer". Notable people with the surname include:

- Anthony Edward Pevec (1925–2014), Auxiliary bishop of the Diocese of Cleveland
- Illène Pevec (born 1948), American activist and author
- Katija Pevec, American actress
- Metod Pevec (1958), Slovenian film director, actor, and screenwriter
- Veselka Pevec, Slovenian Paralympic sport shooter
