= Světice =

- Municipality
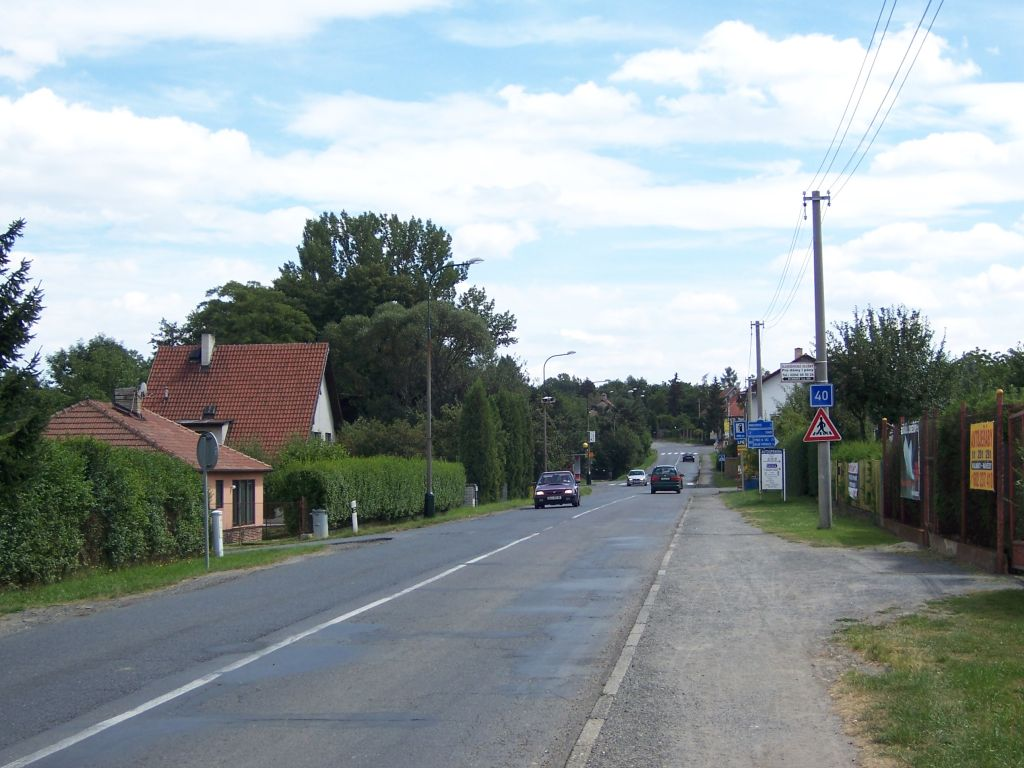
- Main road

- Flag Coat of arms

- Location in the Czech Republic
- Coordinates: 49°58′13″N 14°39′57″E
- Country: Czech Republic
- Region: Central Bohemian
- District: Prague-East
- First mentioned: 1455

Area
  - Total: 1.20 km^{2} (0.46 sq mi)
- Elevation: 370 m (1,210 ft)

Population (2026-01-01)
  - Total: 1,457
  - Density: 1,210/km^{2} (3,140/sq mi)
- Time zone: UTC+1 (CET)
  - Summer (DST): UTC+2 (CEST)
- Postal code: 251 01
- Website: www.obecsvetice.cz

Světice is a municipality and village in Prague-East District in the Central Bohemian Region of the Czech Republic. It has about 1,500 inhabitants.

== Etymology ==
The name is derived from the personal name Svata, meaning "the village of Svata's people". Svata is a shortened form of the female name Svatoslava.

== Geography ==
Světice is located about 13 kilometres (8 mi) southeast of Prague. It lies in the Benešov Uplands. The highest point is at 412 m (1,352 ft) above sea level. The stream Říčanský potok flows through the municipality.

== History ==
The first written mention of Světice is from 1455. Until 2020, the first written mention of Světice was considered to be a document from 1318, but this was a mistake by historians and a confusion with Votice.

Until the establishment of an independent municipality in 1848, the village belonged to the Černý Kostelec estate. During the Thirty Years' War (probably in 1635), the village was destroyed. In a document from 1673, Světice was still listed as an abandoned village. The village was restored at the beginning of the 18th century at the latest.

== Demographics ==
Historical population

Year	Pop.	±%
1869	141	—
1880	181	+28.4%
1890	186	+2.8%
1900	191	+2.7%
1910	262	+37.2%

Year	Pop.	±%
1921	263	+0.4%
1930	275	+4.6%
1950	377	+37.1%
1961	437	+15.9%
1970	449	+2.7%

Year	Pop.	±%
1980	503	+12.0%
1991	509	+1.2%
2001	684	+34.4%
2011	1,117	+63.3%
2021	1,343	+20.2%

Source: Censuses

== Transport ==
Světice is located on the railway line Prague–Benešov.

== Sights ==
There are no protected cultural monuments in the municipality.
