= Z1 (television) =

Local commercial television station in Zagreb, Croatia

Zagrebačka Televizija (Television of Zagreb), also known as Z1 Televizija, is a local commercial television station based in capital city of Croatia, Zagreb. Television started its broadcasting in August 2004 as Z1.

It was also known by the name TV Sljeme.

There are more notable TV talk shows produced and aired on Z1 are Nightmare Stage by Željko Malnar, Večernji pressing by N. Cvijanović, Vježbanje demokracije by B. Vukšić, Ćiroskop by Miroslav Blažević, Opasne veze by T. Dujmović and others.

Z1 is controversial in its daily programing (especially the show ''Bujica'' of rightwing activist Velimir Bujanec) and was deplatformed by national media regulator twice, in 2016 and 2018, due to hate speech.

== Controversies and broadcasting bans ==
The first ban on Z1 television broadcasting was passed on January 22, 2016, due to hate speech on the show Markov trg. The decision to stop broadcasting was made by the Council for Electronic Media after the host Marko Jurič closed the show Markov trg with the words: "Notice to the citizens of Zagreb, to all who walk the Flower Square: be careful since there is a church nearby where, to paraphrase a Serb minister, Chetnik vicars reside. Be careful when walking through Cvjetni Square, especially mothers with children, so that none of these Chetnik vicars would run out of the church and in their manner of slaughter perform their bloody feast on our most beautiful square in Zagreb, which may be marked with "watch out, sharp Chetnik nearby" signs. The Council described it as "favoring and inciting hatred or discrimination based on race or ethnic origin or color, sex, language, religion, political or other belief, national or social origin ... (...)". The revocation of the concession began at 00:00 on January 26, 2016, and the ban lasted for three days. Due to this decision, about five thousand protesters gathered in front of the Council building and protested against the decision.

The second ban on broadcasting was passed in 2018 due to hate speech established in the show Bujica hosted by Velimir Bujanac on November 5, 2018. Apart from Z1 television, the ban on broadcasting was also given to other partner televisions that broadcast the said show: SBTV, Osijek Television, Srca TV, Adriatic TV, and TV Jadran. Due to the broadcast and rerun of the show Z1, the television was punished with a 24-hour ban on broadcasting on December 3, 2018.
