= Vukomerec =

Neighbourhood of Zagreb, Croatia

- Interactive map of Vukomerec
- Coordinates: 45.809°N 16.046°E

Vukomerec is a neighbourhood in the southeast of Zagreb, Croatia, within the Peščenica – Žitnjak district. The area of the local city council of Vukomerec has a population of 1,416 (census 2021).

Vukomerec was a small village in the 19th century, with 83 inhabitants recorded by a 1866 gazetteer, while in the latter half of the 20th century it grew together with the new Peščenica settlement.
