= Lužani, Croatia =

Lužani
- Village
- Interactive map of Lužani
- Location within Croatia
- Coordinates: 45°10′01″N 17°42′09″E
- Country: Croatia
- County: Brod-Posavina
- Municipality: Oriovac

Area
  - Total: 3.7 sq mi (9.6 km^{2})

Population (2021)
  - Total: 850
  - Density: 230/sq mi (89/km^{2})
- Time zone: UTC+1 (CET)
  - Summer (DST): UTC+2 (CEST)

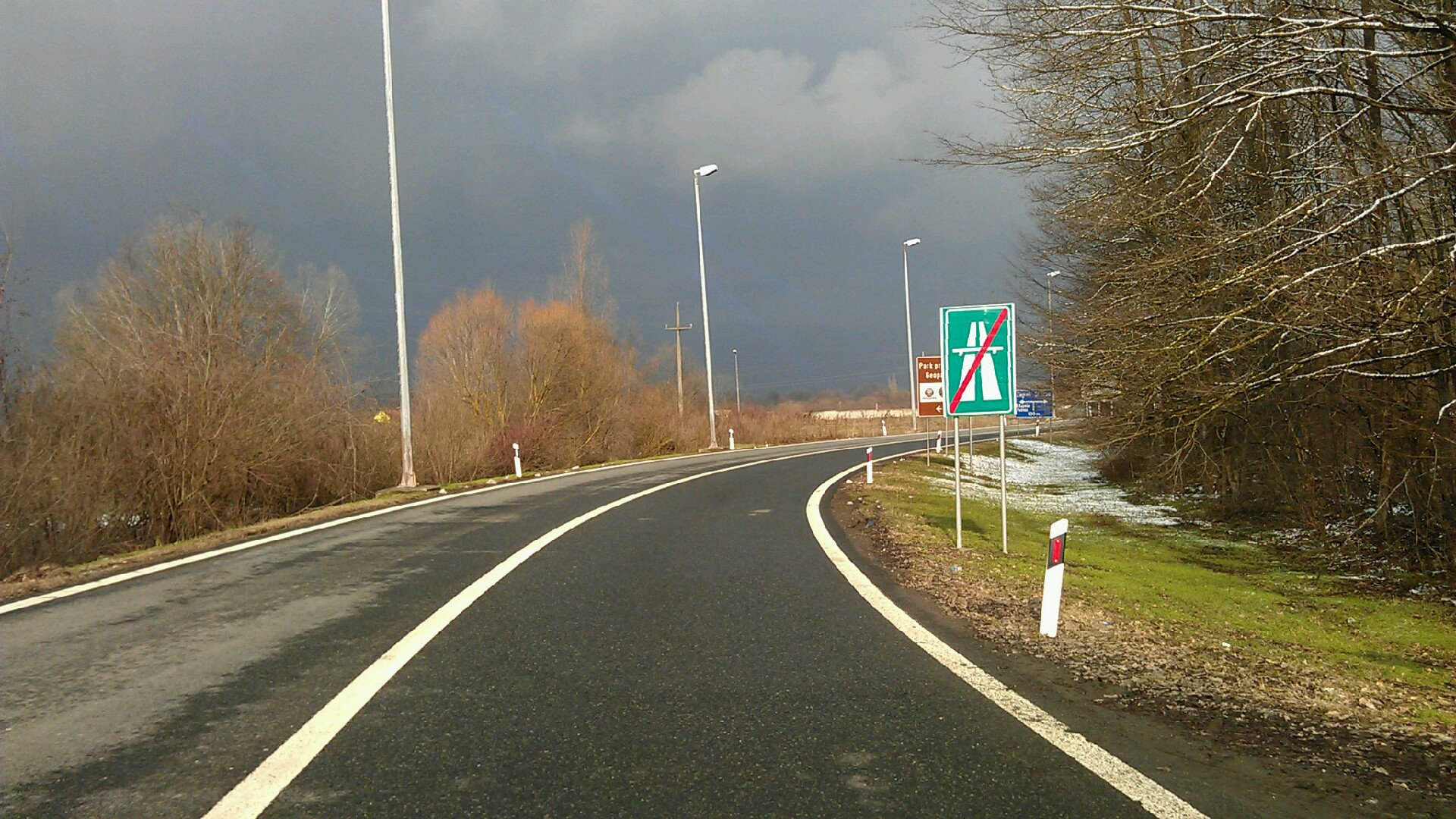
Road curving through Lužani, Croatia

Lužani is a village in Croatia.

== History ==
The Serbian Orthodox Church of the Holy Trinity at the local cemetery was destroyed during World War II in Yugoslavia. A smaller new church was built after the war but was also demolished with explosives in 1991 during the Croatian War of Independence. A mortuary was later built on the same site.
