= Buzin, Zagreb =

Neighborhood of Zagreb, Croatia

Buzin
- Village
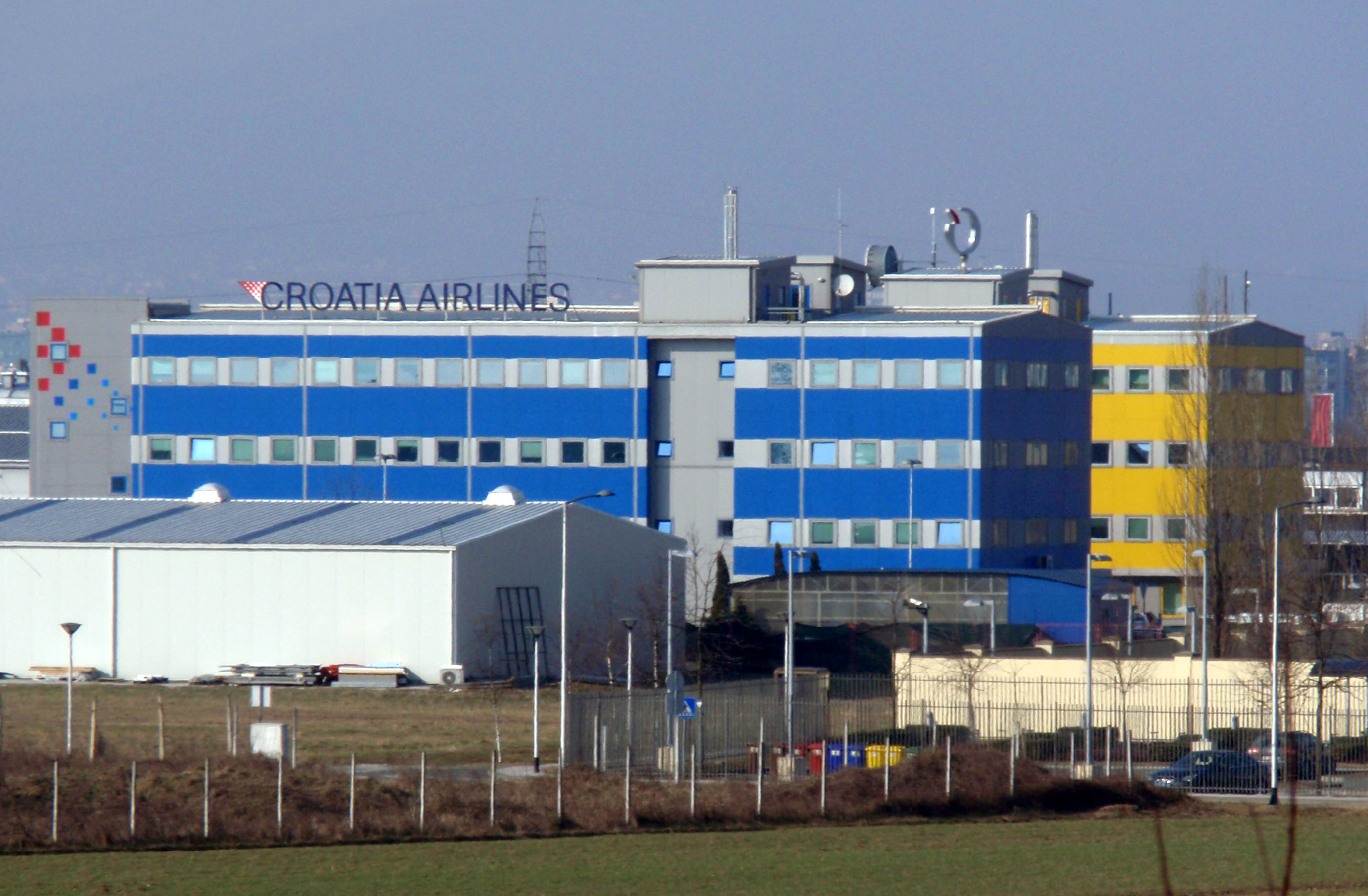
- Headquarters of Croatia Airlines in Buzin

- Location within Croatia
- Coordinates: 45.749905°N 15.993914°E
- Country: Croatia
- County: City of Zagreb
- City District: Novi Zagreb - istok

Area
  - Total: 1.2 sq mi (3.2 km^{2})

Population (2021)
  - Total: 1,074
  - Density: 870/sq mi (340/km^{2})
- Time zone: UTC+1 (CET)
  - Summer (DST): UTC+2 (CEST)

Buzin is a neighborhood of Zagreb in Croatia. It is a part Novi Zagreb-East district located just south of the Zagreb Shunting Yard train station. Zagreb bypass runs through the neighborhood and the adjacent D30/A3 interchange is named after it.

== Demographics ==
According to the 2021 census, its population was 1,074. According to the 2001 census, Buzin counted 141 inhabitants.
