= Ferenščica =

Neighbourhood of Zagreb, Croatia

Coordinates: 45°48′02″N 16°01′22″E

- Interactive map of Ferenščica

Ferenščica is a neighbourhood in the southeast of Zagreb, Croatia, within the Peščenica – Žitnjak district. The area of the local city council of Ferenščica has a population of 5,774 (census 2021).

The area is part of the new Peščenica settlement that started to be built in the second part of the 20th century.
