= Institut IGH =

INSTITUT IGH, d.d.
- Company type: Joint-stock company
- Traded as: ZSE: IGH
- Industry: Civil engineering
- Founded: 1949
- Headquarters: Zagreb, Croatia
- Key people: Robert Petrosian Managing Director
- Number of employees: 568
- Website: www.igh.hr

Institut IGH, d.d. is a Croatian company active in civil engineering professional services and scientific research, including development of designs, studies, supervision, consulting, investigation works, assessments, laboratory testing and instrument calibration. The company has received certificates for the services it provides, namely: EN ISO 9001, EN ISO 14001 and OHSAS 18001.

Designs developed by Institut IGH include sections and structures on a number of Croatian motorways such as the A5 motorway Osijek - Đakovo section; the A4 motorway Novi Marof - Breznički Hum section and Hrastovec Tunnel on the A4 motorway; significant portions of the A1 motorway; as well as designs and other documents and services related to construction of the Pelješac Bridge; reconstruction and expansion of Port of Gruž, Dubrovnik, Croatia; construction of Adler - Alpika road near Sochi, Russia; reconstruction of Zagreb Airport etc.

Share capital of the company is 116,604,710.00 Croatian kuna and 613,709 shares of the company have been issued at nominal value of 190.00 kuna. The company is listed at Zagreb Stock Exchange and included in its CROBEX index. General manager of the company is Robert Petrosian.

IGH was founded as Laboratorij građevinarstva (Civil Engineering Laboratory) in 1949, and renamed to Institut građevinarstva Hrvatske (Institute of Civil Engineering of Croatia) in 1951. It became part of the academic system in 1962, and merged with the Faculty of Civil Engineering of the University of Zagreb in 1977. Since 1991 the Institute functions separately. In 2009, the company name was shortened to the present form.
