= Željko Malnar =

Croatian maverick traveller, writer and television personality

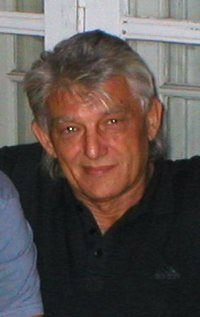
- Malnar in 2003

1st President of Republic of Peščenica
- In office 3 October 1992 – 9 July 2013

Personal details
- Born: 12 April 1944 Zagreb, Independent State of Croatia
- Died: 9 July 2013 (aged 69) Zagreb, Croatia
- Spouse: Emira Malnar (m. 1989)
- Education: Indian Institute of Mass Communication, Delhi

Željko Malnar (12 April 1944 – 9 July 2013) was a Croatian maverick traveller, writer and a fringe television celebrity, best known for his own weekly show Nightmare Stage and his satirical micronation the Republic of Peščenica.

== Biography ==
His first expedition was in 1964 in the area of Perućica, Bosnia and Herzegovina, the last remaining primeval forest in Europe.

Between 1965 and 1995 he traveled the Middle East, Africa, South America, Oceania, Pakistan and India in numerous expeditions. He co-wrote the book U potrazi za staklenim gradom (In pursuit of the glass city).

In the period between 1970 and 1974 he studied philosophy and mass media in India and the Indian philosopher Swami Ashram Shama, which allowed him to gain more insight into Indian society. He ended studies as the best foreign student. He received diploma personally from Indian president V. V. Giri. In India, he worked for the producers Don Charnon, Canadian film ltd, Indian film division, and for the government of the state Rajasthan. In 1977 he led an expedition for Zagreb television entitled "Journey to the East", which had great success.

In 1982 he became the leader of professional expeditions, and worked for the Institute of Ecotechnics which has its headquarters in London. For the U.S. company Tropic Ventures he operated one of the largest expedition the world called "Around the Tropic World" (1982–1986). He is the author of the documentary series with the expedition entitled "Journey to other worlds." Speleological participating in expeditions that achieved the world accepted the results in the scientific world (the discovery of the longest olm).

Malnar authored over 100 documentary films and reports from Turkey, Jordan, Ethiopia, Iraq, Iran, Yemen, Syria, Saudi Arabia, Afghanistan, Pakistan, India, Tibet, Sri Lanka, Burma, Thailand, Vietnam, Malaysia, Indonesia, Panama, Ecuador, Samoa, the South Pacific, New Hebrides, Solomon Islands, etc. He received many awards throughout the world – Chicago International Film Festival, Barcelona Film Festival, etc. In 1986 he got the city keys to Fort Worth, Dallas in the U.S. state of Texas from mayor Bob Bolan as a reward for bringing cultures and peoples. He is the only holder of foreign titles SEIU (chiefs speaking) Polynesian states Samoa.

In 1992, Malnar started producing Nightmare Stage, a show that hosted many picturesque characters from the streets of Zagreb (Cro Rom, Stankec, Tarzan, Jaran, Laki, Ševa etc.). Malnar proclaimed himself the president of the so-called Republic of Peščenica (Zagreb suburb) in the beginning of the 1990s, a satirical-parodical project, a parody on contemporary Croatian political scene.

In 2004, the City Council of Zagreb nominated Željko Malnar for the city award (plaketa) for his work on Nightmare Stage, for the show's "authenticity, brave opposition to an artificial virtual world, false greatness and hypocrisy in the society".

In 2005, Malnar's TV show included shots from a local pornographic movie, which caused the Croatian agency for electronic media regulation to censure his then-station OTV and force it off the air for a period of 24 hours.

The Nighmare Stage was later broadcast on the TV station Z1.

Željko Malnar died at age 69 in Zagreb. He was cremated and his ashes were scattered in the Adriatic Sea.

== Alexander III of Macedon journey ==
Malnar has always been fascinated by Alexander III of Macedon (Alexander the Great) and his travels by horse. He decided to repeat Alexander's trip to Afghanistan by horse. As he later said, it was for him the highest and most difficult expedition that he did not finish. After two years of preparation on 30 May 1991. Malnar with his four friends, four horses and a jeep took off to the East. They began in Karlovac, Croatia and traveled through Macedonia and Bulgaria to Turkey. In Turkey, Malnar found out that the war broke out in Croatia so he decided to travel under Croatian flag instead of Yugoslav, resulting in cancellation of sponsorship which lead to financial problems. At the entrance to Syria Bassel al-Assad heard about their expedition and provided all the supplies, because he felt they were conducting a worldwide venture. In Lebanon, Malnar was a guest of Sheik Abbas al-Musawi, who died ten days later in an Israeli attack. They were also received by Mohammad Hussein Fadlallah. The journey was interrupted in 1992 in Jordan, near the border with Saudi Arabia, due to a personal loss in Malnar's family.

== Films ==
- Over 70 independent documentary films from all over world (1975–1995)
- Journey To Other Worlds, documentary series (1982–1986)
- Peščenopolis (2004)
- Hrvatska mora ("Croatian nightmare") (2005)

== Books ==
- U potrazi za staklenim gradom ("In search of the glass city", 1986)
- Filozofija Republike Peščenice ("Philosophy of Republic of Peščenica", 2004)
- Željko Malnar – Put Aleksandra Velikog ("Željko Malnar – the path of Alexander the Great", 2013)

== TV shows ==
- Little Secrets of Great Chefs, Yugoslav cooking show on TV Zagreb, 1 episode, Indian curry (1987)
- Proleterac, kids TV show on TV Belgrade (1988)
- Nightmare Stage (3 October 1992 – 26 June 2010)
- Mali Noćni Razgovori (9 October 2010 – 28 May 2011)
- U Predsjedničkoj Rezidenciji (24 February 2013 – 12 May 2013)
