= Ivanja Reka interchange =

Cloverleaf interchange in Zagreb County, Croatia

- Croatian: Čvor Ivanja Reka
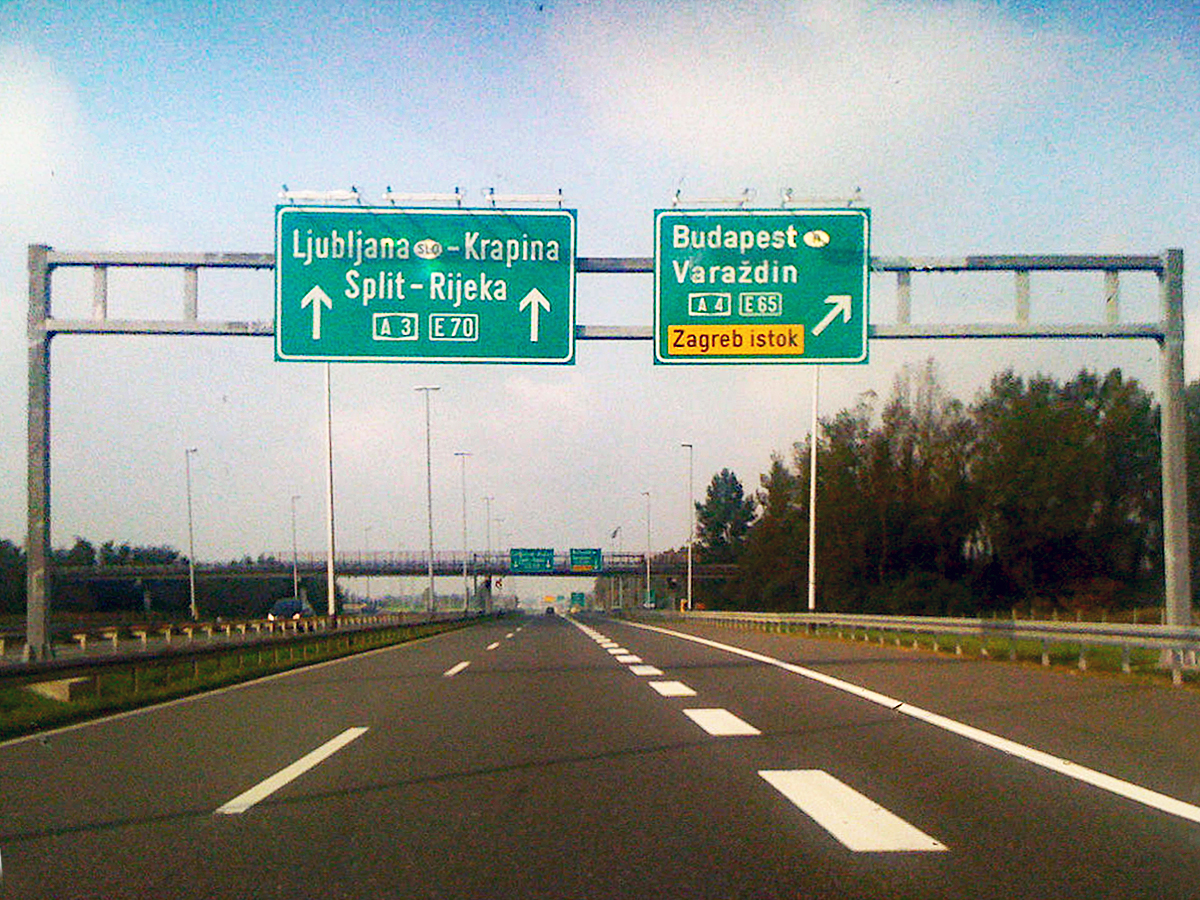
- Ivanja Reka interchange, approach along the westbound A3

Location
- Ivanja Reka, Zagreb, Croatia
- Coordinates: 45.799965°N 16.131191°E
- Roads at junction: A3 / E70 A4 / E65 / E71 D3

Construction
- Type: Cloverleaf interchange

The Ivanja Reka interchange (Croatian: Čvor Ivanja Reka) is a cloverleaf interchange east of Zagreb, Croatia. The interchange represents the southern terminus of the A4 motorway and it connects the A4 route to the A3 motorway representing major a link in the Croatian motorway system. The interchange is a part of Pan-European corridors Vb and X. It also represents a junction of European routes E65, E70 and E71.

The interchange was completed at junction of the Slavonska Avenue—four lane road providing access to Zagreb, present-day A3 motorway section to Lipovljani, built in 1980, and a 22.15-kilometre (13.76 mi) section between the Lučko and Ivanja Reka interchanges, a section of the Zagreb bypass opened in 1981. It was named after the nearby village of Ivanja Reka. The interchange originally also included a four-lane road, later upgraded and renamed as A4 motorway connecting Varaždin.

== See also ==
- International E-road network
- Transport in Croatia
