= Velika Kosnica =

- Village
- Location within Croatia
- Coordinates: 45°46′N 16°05′E
- Country: Croatia
- Region: Central Croatia
- County: Zagreb County
- Municipality: Velika Gorica

Area
  - Total: 2.6 km^{2} (1.0 sq mi)

Population (2021)
  - Total: 738
  - Density: 280/km^{2} (740/sq mi)
- Time zone: UTC+1 (CET)
  - Summer (DST): UTC+2 (CEST)

Velika Kosnica is a village in Croatia. It is connected by the D3 highway at the A3 interchange.

== See also ==
- Mala Kosnica
- Petina, Croatia
- Zagreb Airport
