= Ljubljanska Avenue =

Major thoroughfare in Zagreb, Croatia

Coordinates: 45°47′50″N 15°52′55″E

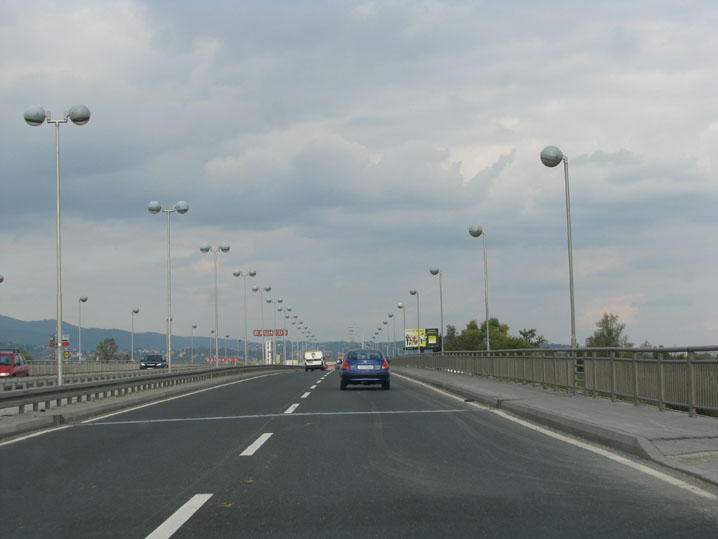
Ljubljanska Avenue over Jankomir bridge

Ljubljanska Avenue (Croatian: Ljubljanska avenija) is one of the most travelled thoroughfares in Zagreb, Croatia. It is a four-lane divided avenue that runs from the Savska Opatovina rotary (located in the western part of the Trešnjevka - sjever district) in the east to the Jankomir interchange with the Zagreb bypass in the west. The road uses the recently upgraded Jankomir bridge over the Sava river and it is fully grade-separated.

The Ljubljanska used to start further east, at the intersection with the Savska Road in the outer city center, but the recently renovated part between Savska Road and Savska Opatovina was renamed to Zagrebačka Avenue.
