= Stara Peščenica =

Neighbourhood of Zagreb, Croatia

- Interactive map of Stara Peščenica
- Coordinates: 45°48′42″N 16°0′22″E

Stara Peščenica (pronounced [ˈstara peʃtʃeˈnitsa]) is a neighborhood located in the northwestern corner of the Peščenica – Žitnjak administrative city district of Zagreb, Croatia. It is bordered by Zvonimirova Street and the J. F. Kennedy Square on the north, Budakova Street on the east, railway (later Branimirova Avenue) on the south and Vjekoslav Heinzel Avenue on the west.

The local administrative subdivision is called MO Peščenica and has a population of 5,684 (2021).

The neighborhood's name (translated to English as Old Peščenica) correctly displays it both as the oldest part of what is today Peščenica - Žitnjak district, and having a rich history.

== History ==
Stara Peščenica began as a village in the vicinity of Zagreb in the 19th century. After the Mošinsky's 1902 annexation of Lašćina and Žitnjak municipalities into the City of Zagreb, and urban sprawl encompassing areas east of Heinzel Avenue, poor settlements sprang up north of the railway exiting the city. One of these settlements was Stara Peščenica, growing along the namesake street. The other one was Naselak, a street, which over time became engulfed by Stara Peščenica. Though, most of the houses are still standing to date, to which the neighborhood owes an anachronous appearance.

After the World War I, the Austro-Hungarian empire dissolved and Zagreb was incorporated in the Kingdom of Yugoslavia. While being a capital of a province of sorts, Zagreb stopped being in a shadow cast by an economically and culturally more important city. It became the center of the Yugoslav economy and started to attract workers and people from rural areas. The population more than doubled in the next twenty years. While the city area (today Donji Grad) remained on the same area, the suburbs vastly spread out. The poor neighborhoods moved further east and the northern part of Stara Peščenica became a part of the well-designed wealthy "officer apartment city district". On the other hand, the rest of Peščenica (including southern part of Stara Peščenica) remained cheap and randomly parcelized land, having estate prices up to 8 times lower than Donji Grad. The Zvonimirova Street served as a boundary between the rich and the poor. Although the real estate prices have risen, Stara Peščenica today remains a randomly built neighborhood with lots of different sizes and a structure not resembling the grid of nearby Donji Grad and southern Maksimir.

== See also ==
- History of Zagreb
