= European route E73 =

Road in trans-European E-road network

E73

Route information
- Length: 679 km (422 mi)

Major junctions
- North end: E60 / E71 / E75 at Budapest, Hungary
- E66 at Dunaújváros, Hungary; E70 at Sredanci, Croatia; E661 at Zenica, Bosnia and Herzegovina; E761 at Sarajevo, Bosnia and Herzegovina
- South end: E65 at Opuzen, Croatia

Location
- Countries: Hungary, Croatia, Bosnia and Herzegovina

Highway system
- International E-road network; A Class; B Class
← E72	→ E74

European route E73 forms part of the United Nations International E-road network, connecting Hungary and Slavonia to Bosnia and Herzegovina and the Adriatic Sea in the vicinity of the port of Ploče. This 679-kilometre (422 mi) route is also designated as the Pan-European Corridor Vc, a branch of the fifth Pan-European corridor. The route largely consists of two-lane roads with at-grade intersections, although in the 2000s, about a third of the route was upgraded to motorway standards. The remainder of the route is currently being upgraded in all the countries spanned. The longest part of this corridor goes through Bosnia and Herzegovina and is widely touted as a road instrumental to the development of the country. As such, and given its geographical location, the road has occasionally been dubbed as the kičma Bosne (eng. The spine of Bosnia). The road also serves as the shortest connection of the eastern and southern parts of Croatia.

== Route description ==
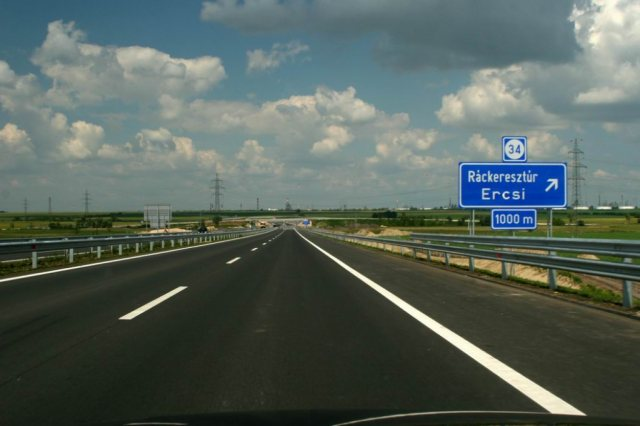
E73 as Hungarian M6 motorway, near Ráckeresztúr exit

The European route E73 is a part of the International E-road network, 679 km (422 mi) long, connecting parts of Hungary and Croatia and Bosnia and Herzegovina to the Adriatic Sea coast near the port of Ploče. The route is a Class A intermediate north–south road, consisting of 275 km (171 mi) of motorways, and a substantial proportion of two-lane roads with at-grade intersections.

=== Hungary ===
The E73 starts at the Budapest ring motorway, providing connection to the Hungarian motorway network, as well as the European routes E60, E71 and E75, at an interchange with the M6 motorway taking the E73 route south, past Dunaújváros and Szekszárd towards Bóly, where the motorway (as of August 2011) terminates, and the E73 switches to routes 57 and then 56 past Mohács to Udvar/Duboševica border crossing where the route crosses to Croatia. The Hungarian section of the E73 is 196 kilometres (122 miles) long, and all but the last 20 kilometres (12 miles) has been upgraded to the motorway standards. The final section of the motorway to the Croatian border is planned to extend to a new border crossing at Ivándárda.

=== Slavonia ===
The E73 route through Croatia starts at Duboševica border crossing, following the D7 state road to Beli Manastir and Osijek. South of Beli Manastir, there is a junction with the European route E662, signposted as the D212 state road. The D7 road carries the E73 through Osijek, to the southern city bypass, an expressway signposted as the D2 state road providing a connection to the A5 motorway to the west of Osijek. The A5 is scheduled for extension north to the Hungarian border, where it would link up with the Hungarian M6 motorway. The A5 extends south to the Sredanci interchange whee it meets the A3 motorway, which carries the E70. The A5 continues further south to the border of Bosnia and Herzegovina and Svilaj border crossing at the Sava River. First segment of the E73 through Croatia, between Hungary and Bosnia and Herzegovina, is 108 kilometres (67 miles) long, including 56 kilometres (35 miles) of motorways.

=== Bosnia and Herzegovina ===
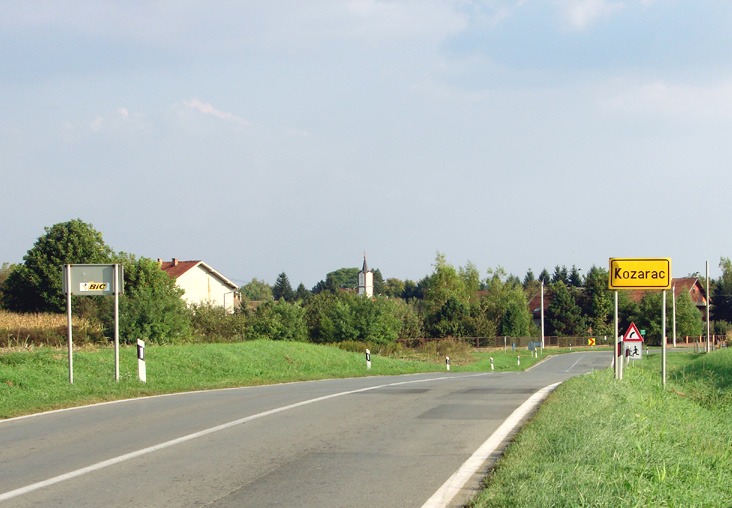
E73 as Croatian D7 state road, in Kozarac, north of Osijek

The E73 route in Bosnia and Herzegovina starts at Svilaj border crossing, following the A1 motorway for 9 kilometres (5.6 mi) to Odžak. Near Odžak the E73 switches from the A1 motorway to a short road connector which carries the E73 to the M-14.1 road. The M-14.1 road carries the E73 to Vukosavlje, located to the north of Modriča where it meets the M-17 road. The M-17 road carries the E73 past Modriča, Doboj, Maglaj, Žepče and Zenica. In Zenica, the E73 switches back to the A1 motorway and forms a junction with European routes E661 and E761. The latter and the E73 are concurrent between Zenica and Sarajevo, where the E761 diverges towards Višegrad. The European route E762 also forms a junction with the E73 in Sarajevo, heading towards Nikšić, Montenegro. The A1 motorway carries the E71 near Zenica, Kakanj, Visoko, Ilijaš, Vogošća, Sarajevo and Tarčin. In Bradina, the E73 once more switches to the M-17 road which carries it past Konjic, Jablanica, Mostar and Čapljina. The route crosses back into Croatia south of Čapljina. Total length of the E73 route through Bosnia and Herzegovina is 366 kilometres (227 miles) long.

=== Dalmatia ===
The southernmost segment of the E73 route is located in Croatia, spanning 11 kilometres (6.8 miles) between Metković border crossing and Opuzen, where the route physically signposted as the D9 state road, connects to the D8 state road (European route E65). The D8 connects the E73 route to the port of Ploče to the north and Dubrovnik to the south. Furthermore, the section has a junction to the D62 state road providing a link to the A1 motorway and the Croatian motorway network in the south of the country. This section completes the total length of the E73 in Croatia of 119 kilometres (74 miles).

=== Tolls ===
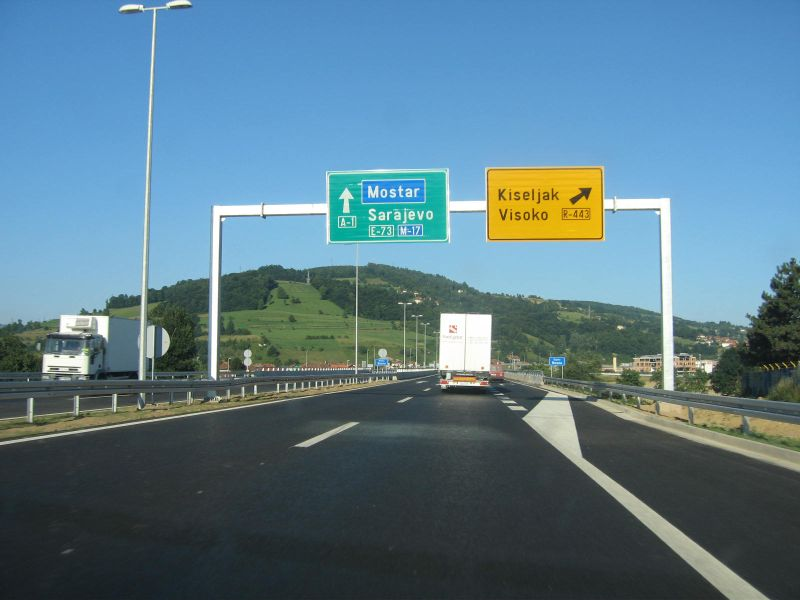
E73 route as A1 at Visoko exit near Sarajevo, Bosnia and Herzegovina

Various sections of the E73 are tolled, using a range of toll collection systems. Motorways in Hungary are tolled using an electronic toll collection (ETC) system with charges differing for various categories of vehicles and length of period when the e-vignette is valid. Croatian motorways are also generally tolled, using a ticket system. All sections of the A5 motorway are tolled, as well as the A3 section concurrent with the E73. As of August 2011, the toll charged along the Croatian section of the E73 route between various toll plazas at each motorway exit, varies depending on the length of route travelled and the vehicle classification in Croatia. The toll is payable in euros and by major credit and debit cards. A prepaid ETC system is also used. State roads in Croatia are not tolled. In Bosnia and Herzegovina, only the A1 motorway is tolled at two mainline toll plazas and further toll plazas at each motorway exit between the mainline toll plazas using a ticket system.

== History ==
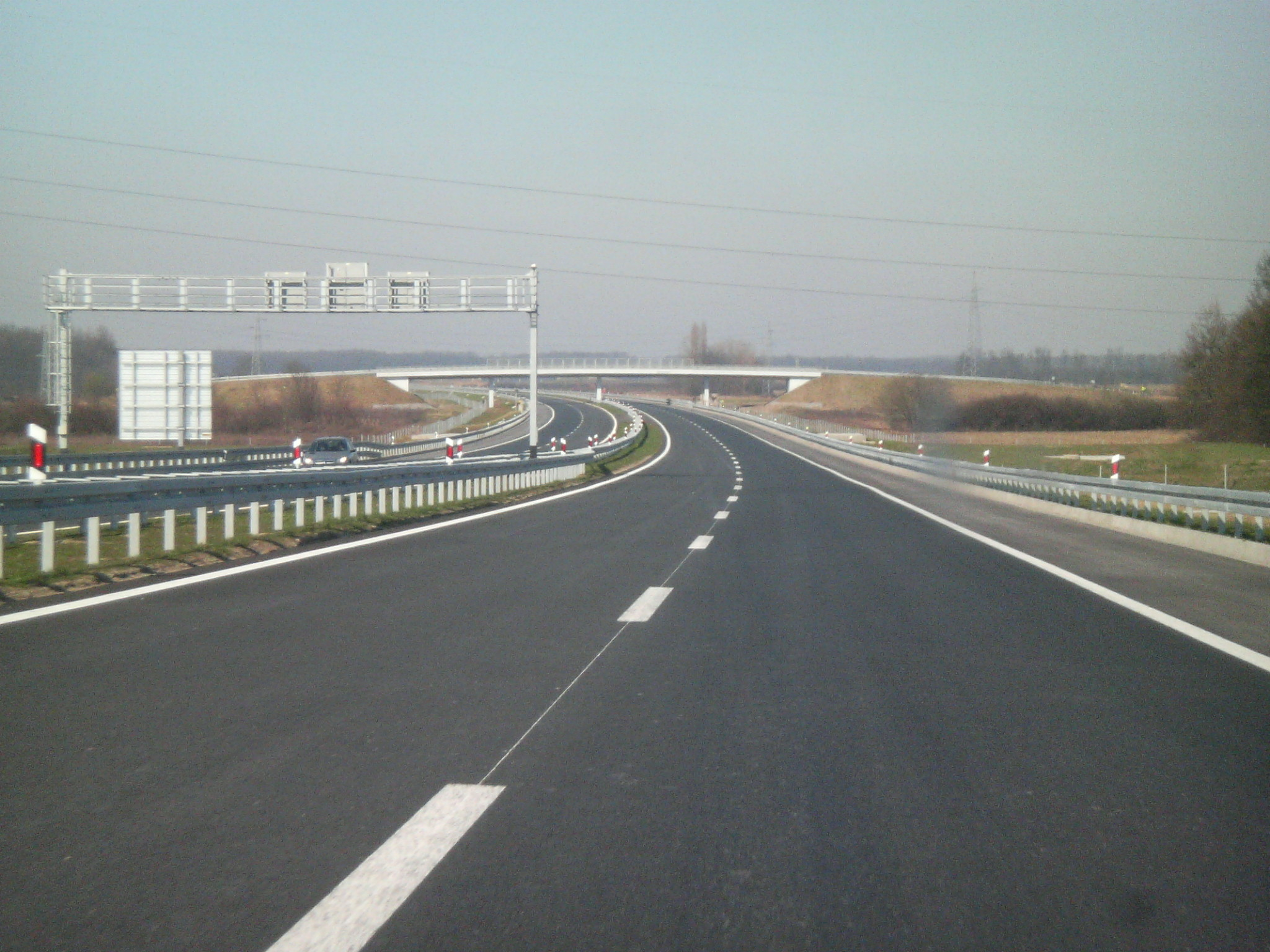
E73 as A5 motorway in Croatia

UNECE was formed in 1947, and their first major act to improve transportation was a joint UN declaration no. 1264, the Declaration on the Construction of Main International Traffic Arteries, signed in Geneva on September 16, 1950, which defined the first E-road network. This declaration was amended several times before November 15, 1975, when it was replaced by the European Agreement on Main International Traffic Arteries or "AGR", which set up a route numbering system and improved standards for roads in the list. The AGR went through several changes, with the last one, as of 2011, in 2008. Reorganization of the E-roads network of 1975 and 1983 redefined the E73 designation previously associated with Cologne–Hamm road and assigned it to Budapest–Osijek–Sarajevo–Metković route.

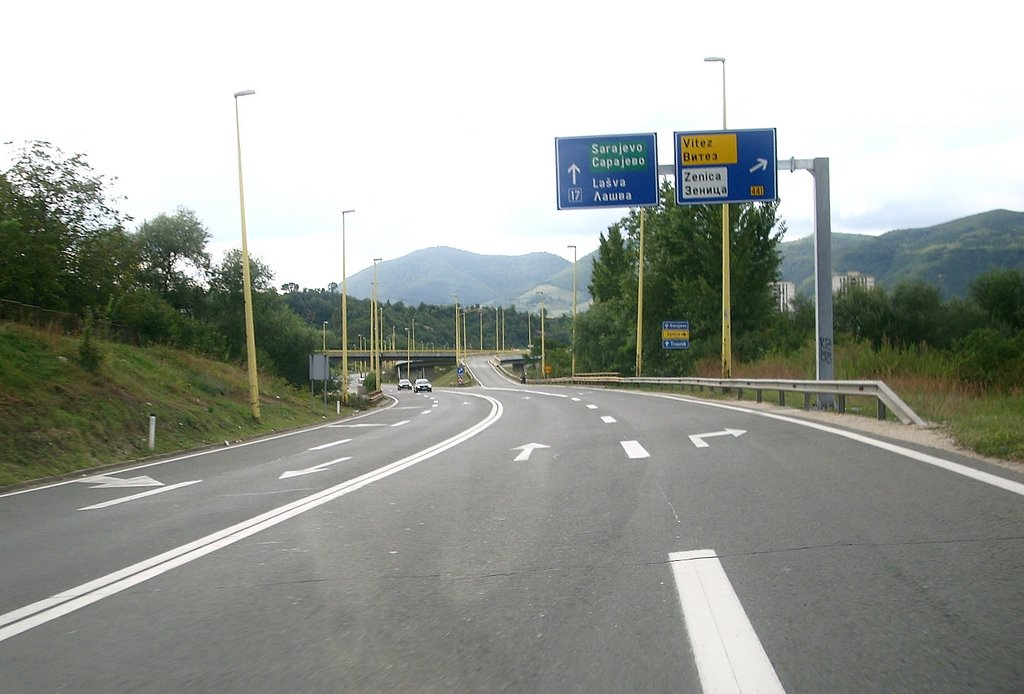
E73 near Zenica, Bosnia and Herzegovina

The entire E73 route was given further importance in June 1997 at the Pan-European Transport Conference in Helsinki, when the section was made a part of the Pan-European Corridor Vc, spanning Budapest and Metković via Osijek and Sarajevo. This event spurred modernization of the route in all the countries where it is located, and since 1997s, one third of the route, previously developed as a two-lane road only, was upgraded to the motorway standards, with plans to upgrade the remainder of the route as well.

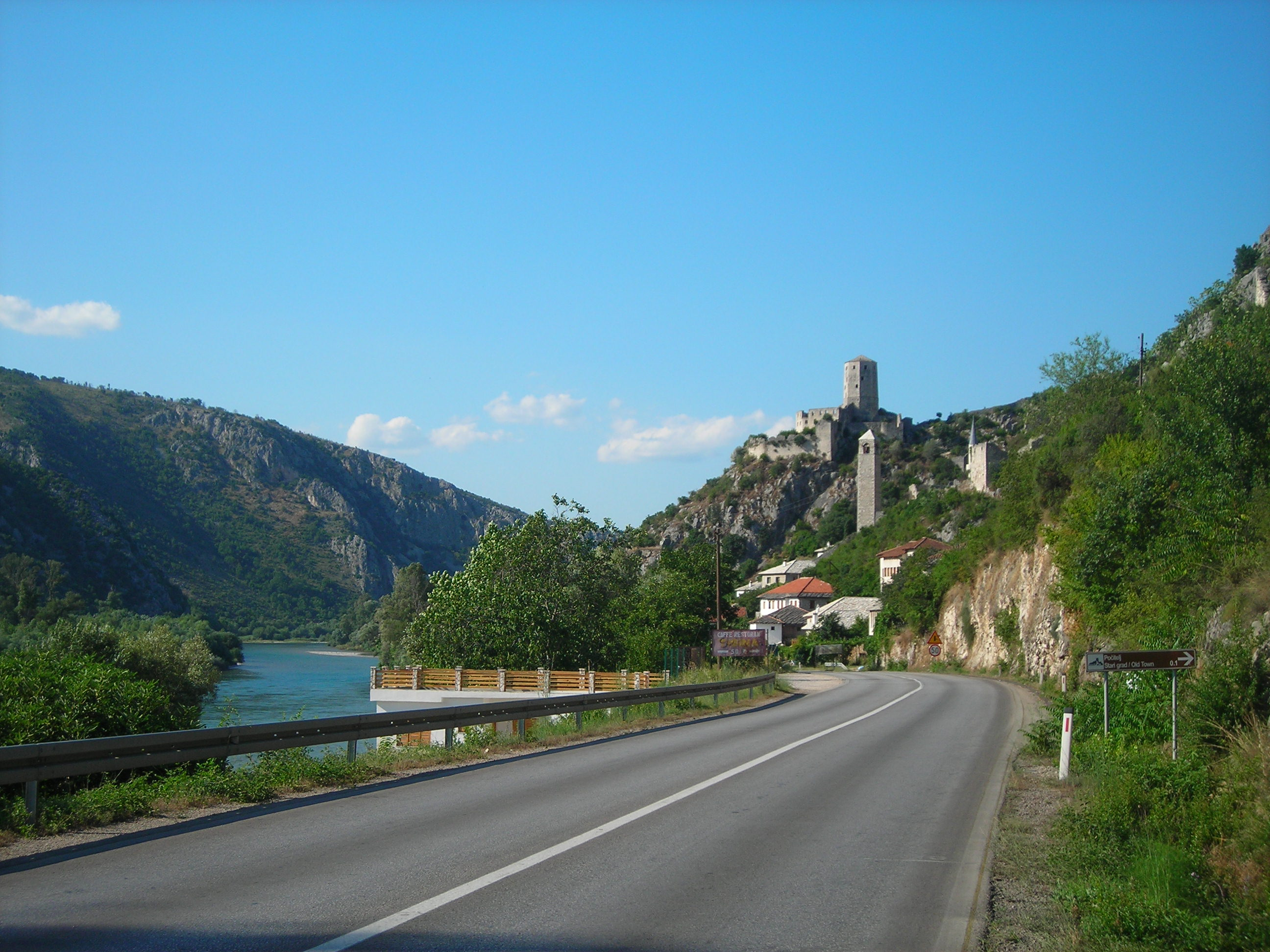
E73 as the M17 road at Počitelj near Mostar

The first Hungarian motorway section along the M6/E73 route was completed between Érd and Dunaújváros in 2006 after the Pan-European Corridor Vc was given development priority following the Helsinki conference. In 2008, the new motorway section was connected to the M0 Budapest ring motorway, and in 2010, the M6 was extended to Bóly. The final section of the motorway to the Croatian border is planned to extend to a new border crossing at Ivándárda, where the M6 shall connect to the Croatian motorway network. In Croatia, the first motorway section completed along the E73 route was the Sredanci–Đakovo section of the A5, completed in 2007, which was extended further to Osijek in 2009. As of August 2011, the A5 was scheduled to be extended north across Drava River to Beli Manastir and the Branjin Vrh border crossing to Hungary where it shall connect to the M6. In 2015, a short section of the A5 between Sredanci and Svilaj interchanges was opened, followed by Svilaj border crossing and bridge across the Sava River in 2021. Prior to the opening of the Svilaj Bridge, the E73 followed the A3 motorway between Sredanci and Velika Kopanica interchanges and the D7 road between Velika Kopanica and Slavonski Šamac, crossing the Sava River at the Šamac border crossing. The A10 motorway is planned to connect Bosnia and Herzegovina to the Croatian motorway system through the A1 motorway and the port of Ploče. The segment of the route through Bosnia and Herzegovina is largely in various stages of planning and development, especially those sections adjacent to the single existing stretch of the A1 motorway near Sarajevo and to planned sections of the Croatian A5 and A10 motorways.

In the early 2000s, the A1 motorway received much media attention in Bosnia and Herzegovina as it was to be the first motorway-standard road in the country. The slow pace of building resulted in the Corridor Vc being parodied as "Corridor WC" in the famous TV satire Nadreality Show.

== Concurrencies ==
Country	km	Route	Control cities	Connecting routes	Notes
Hungary	0-176	M6	Budapest; Bóly	M0; M60	The northern terminus of the E73 is in an interchange of the M6 and the M0 near Budapest. Northbound E73 traffic leaving the segment defaults onto the M0 Budapest ring motorway. The connecting M0 motorway section is concurrent with European routes E60, E71 and E75.
Hungary	176-182	57	Bóly; Mohács		Two-lane road with at-grade intersections.
Hungary	182-194	56	Mohács; Udvar		Two-lane road with at-grade intersections. The southernmost section of the E73 in Hungary.
Croatia	194–237	D7	Duboševica; Beli Manastir; Osijek	D517; D212	Two-lane road with at-grade intersections.
Croatia	237–244	D2	Osijek		Osijek bypass. A two-lane, limited access expressway with grade separated intersections.
Croatia	244–302	A5	Osijek; Svilaj	A3	The current northern terminus of the A5 motorway is the Osijek interchange where the northbound A5/E73 traffic defaults to the D2 road.
Bosnia and Herzegovina	302–317	A1	Donji Svilaj; Odžak	M-14.1	The southern 4 kilometres (2.5 mi) are a two-lane road connector with at-grade intersections.
Bosnia and Herzegovina	317–320	M-14.1	Odžak; Modriča		Two-lane road with at-grade intersections.
Bosnia and Herzegovina	320–442	M-17	Modriča; Zenica	M-4; M-15	Two-lane road with at-grade intersections.
Bosnia and Herzegovina	442–531	A1	Zenica; Sarajevo; Tarčin	M-18	A motorway, concurrent with E761 route between Zenica and Sarajevo.
Bosnia and Herzegovina	531–668	M-17	Tarčin; Mostar; Čapljina; Doljani	M-16.2; M-6.1; M-6	Two-lane road with at-grade intersections.
Croatia	668–679	D9	Metković; Opuzen	D62; D8	Two-lane road with at-grade intersections. Northbound E73 traffic leaving the segment crosses to Bosnia and Herzegovina at Metković border crossing. Southbound E73 traffic leaving the segment switches to the Croatian D8 state road (European route E65) in Opuzen. Even though the UNECE specification of the route notes Metković as the last control city of the E73, the entire D9 route to Opuzen is signposted as the E73. The southernmost segment of the E73.
1.000 mi = 1.609 km; 1.000 km = 0.621 mi

== See also ==
- European long-distance paths
- Road transport
- Transport in Bosnia and Herzegovina
- Motorways in Croatia
- Motorways in Hungary
