= D7 road (Croatia) =

Road in Croatia

D7 state road

Route information
- Part of
- Length: 115.2 km (71.6 mi)

Major junctions
- From: Duboševica border crossing to Hungary
- D517 in Beli Manastir; D212 near Beli Manastir; D2 near Osijek; D515 near Đakovo; A5 in Đakovo interchange D38 near Đakovo; D46 near Đakovo; A3 in Velika Kopanica interchange D520 near Slavonski Šamac
- To: Slavonski Šamac border crossing to Bosnia and Herzegovina

Location
- Country: Croatia
- Counties: Osijek-Baranja, Brod-Posavina
- Major cities: Beli Manastir, Osijek, Đakovo

Highway system
- Highways in Croatia

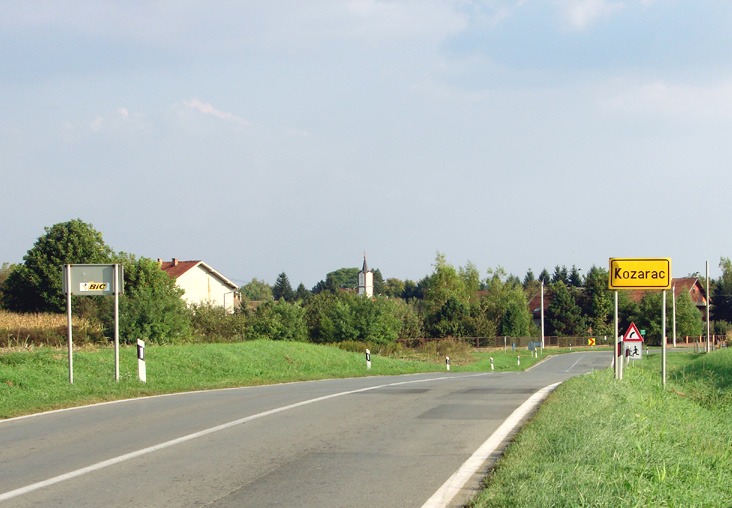
D7 in Kozarac

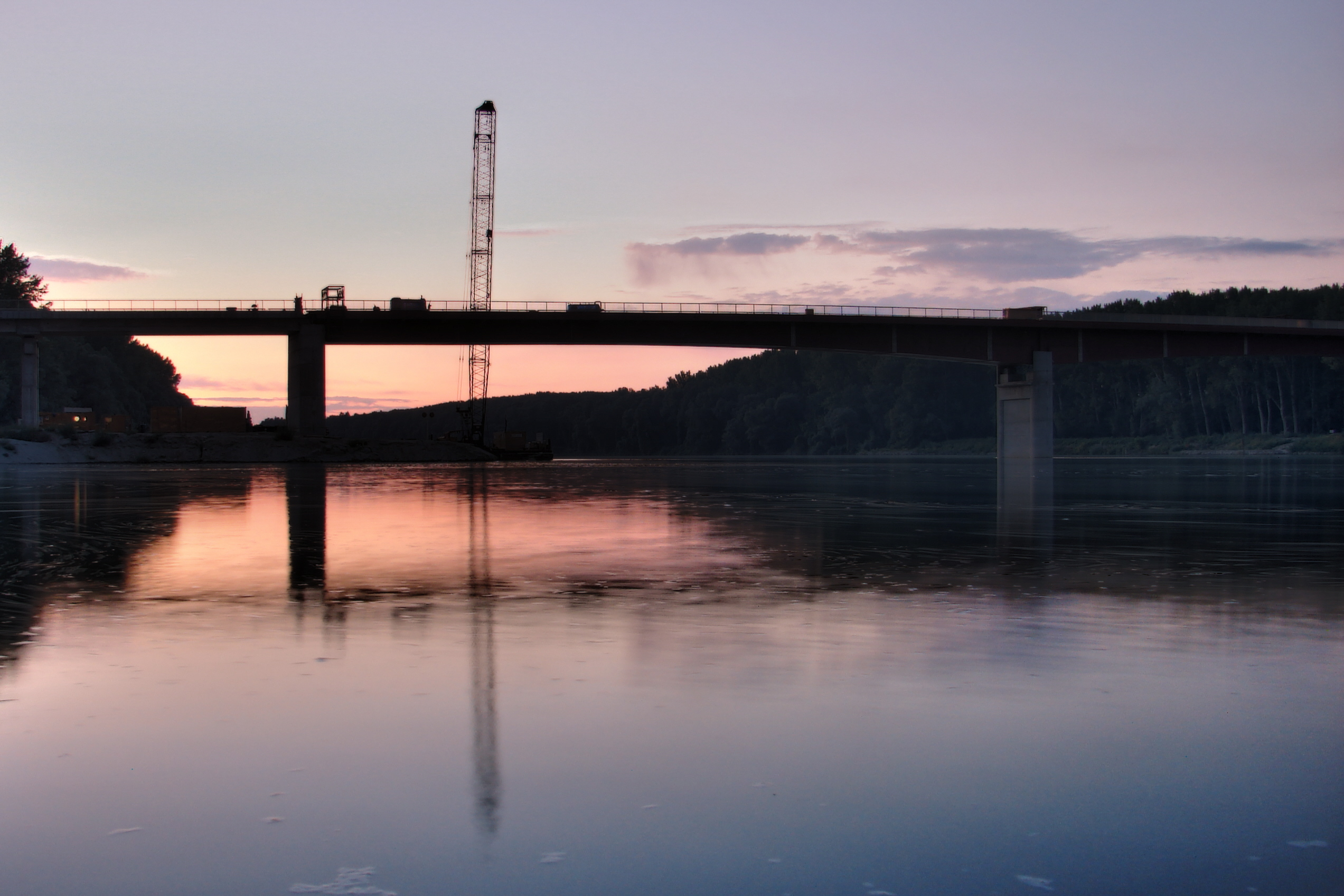
New Drava Bridge, carrying D7

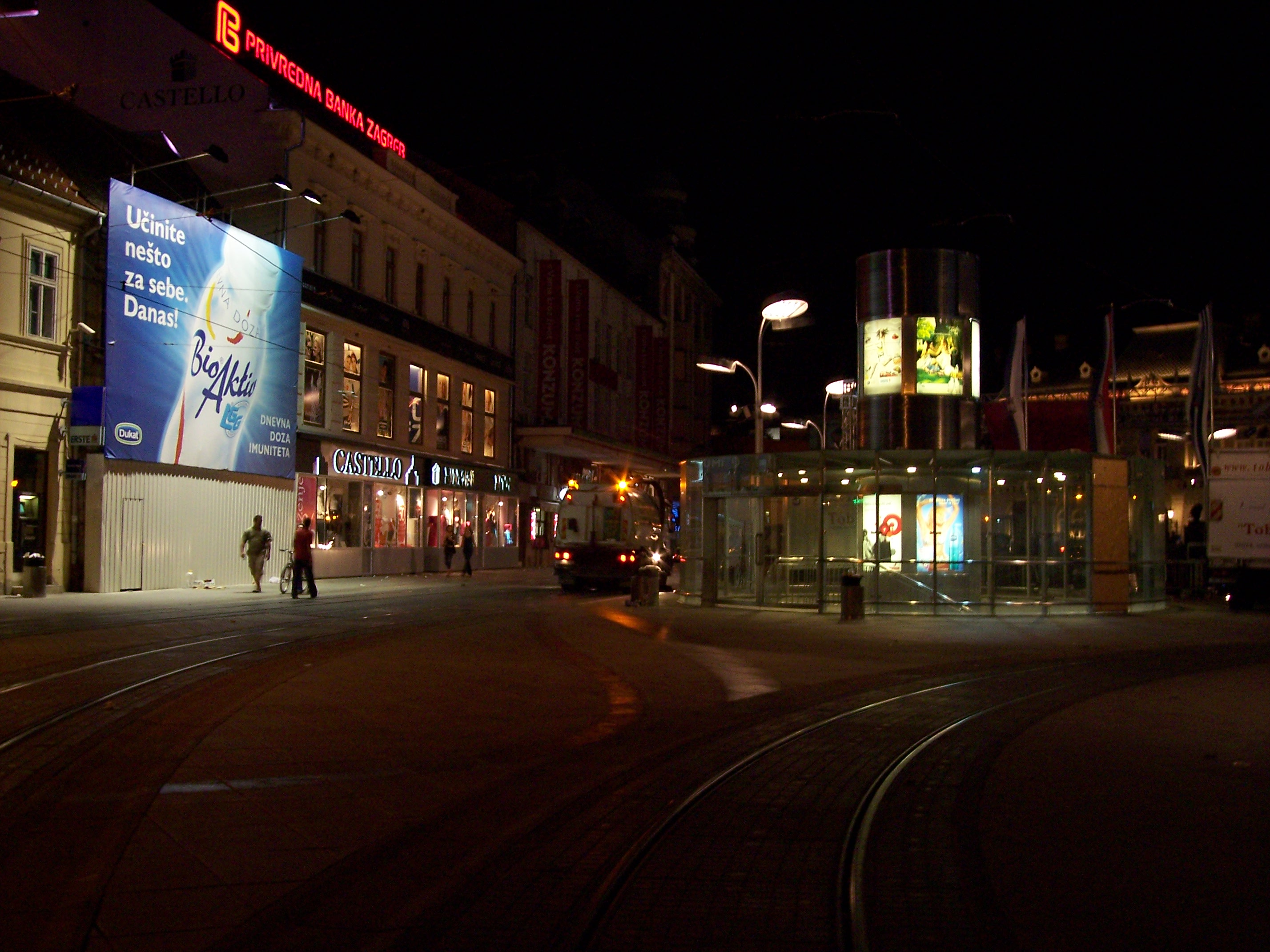
Osijek - a section of D7 comprises its western bypass

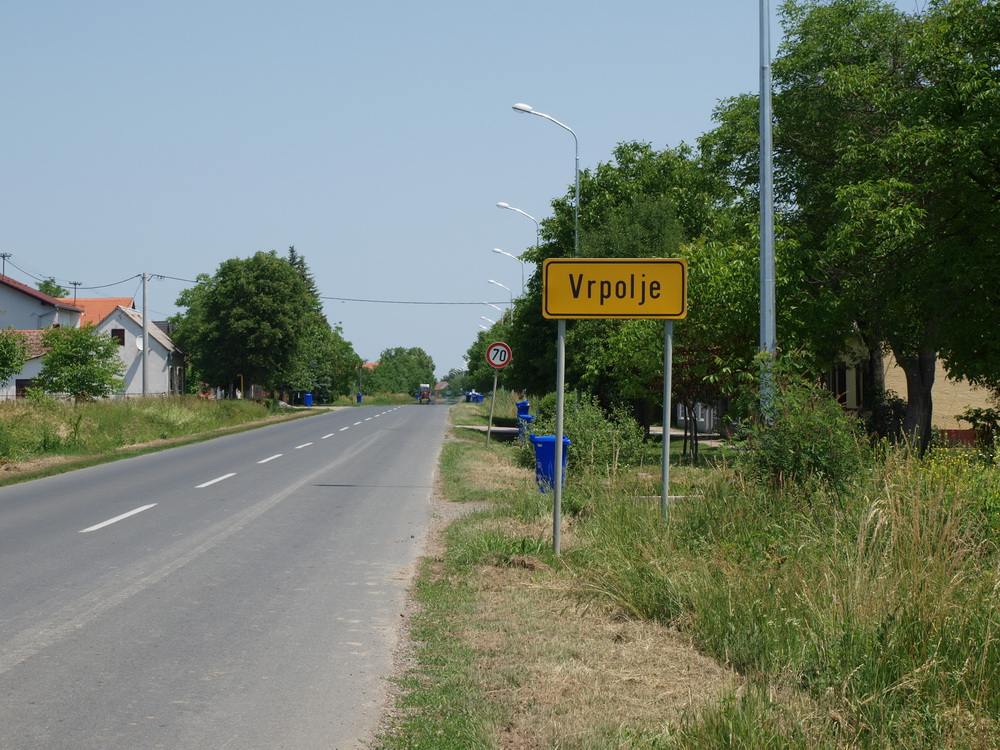
D7 in Vrpolje

D7 is a state road connecting Beli Manastir, Osijek, Čepin and Đakovo to Slavonski Šamac border crossing to Bosnia and Herzegovina and to Duboševica border crossing to Hungary. The road is 115.2 km (71.6 mi) long.

The D7 state road runs parallel to the A5 motorway along its entire length, connecting to virtually all A5 interchanges directly (Đakovo) or indirectly, thus serving as an alternate and backup road to the motorway. Before the A5 motorway was completed, the D7 road served as the main connecting road for traffic to the border crossings to Hungary and Bosnia and Herzegovina.

The road, as well as all other state roads in Croatia, is managed and maintained by Hrvatske ceste.

== Traffic volume ==
Traffic is regularly counted and reported by Hrvatske ceste, operator of the road.

D7 traffic volume
Road	Counting site	AADT	ASDT	Notes
D7	2501 Duboševica	1,095	1,521	Between the border crossing (Hungary) and the Ž4011 junction.
D7	2503 Karanac (Beli Manastir)	5,898	6,370	Between the D517 and D212 junctions.
D7	2505 Čeminac - north	4,520	4,995	Adjacent to the Ž4054 junction.
D7	2513 Osijek northern bypass	5,733	5,715	Between the Ž4257 and Ž4068 junctions.
D7	2512 Čepin	5,419	5,681	Between the D2 and Ž4247 junctions.
D7	3705 Vuka	4,424	4,543	Adjacent to the Ž4107 junction.
D7	3606 Vrpolje	3,262	3,622	Adjacent to the Ž4202 junction.
D7	3615 Sikirevci - south	2,331	2,752	Adjacent to the Ž4220 junction.

== Road junctions and populated areas ==
D7 major junctions/populated areas
Type	Slip roads/Notes
	Duboševica border crossing to Hungary. Hungarian route 56 to Mohács, Hungary. The northern terminus of the road.
	Ž4011 to Duboševica.
	Ž4018 to Topolje, Gajić and Batina (D212).
	Ž4019 to Branjina and Podolje.
	Ž4017 to Kneževo.
	Branjin Vrh
	Ž4293 to Šećerana and Šumarina.
	Beli Manastir; D517 to Belišće.
	D212 to Kneževi Vinogradi and Batina border crossing to Serbia.
	Kozarac
	Čeminac; Ž4054 to Novi Čeminac.
	Švajcarnica; Ž4041 to Bolman and D517; Ž4257 to Darda and Bilje.
	Drava River Bridge - 642 m long.
	D2 - Osijek Retfala interchange on the southern Osijek bypass road connecting Osijek as well as Vukovar to the east, and to A5 motorway (Osijek interchange) and Našice to the west.
	Ž4247 to Čepin.
	Ž4105 to Čepin and to Podgorač (D515).
	Ž4085 to Čepin and Livana.
	Ž4109 to Ernestinovo (D518).
	Ž4107 to Beketinci and Punitovci.
	Vuka; Ž4120 to Koritna.
	Široko Polje; Ž4108 to Jurjevac Punitovački.
	Ž4106 to Tomašanci and Punitovci.
	Kuševac; Ž4130 to Viškovci and Ž4239 to Ivanovci Gorjanski.
	Ž4146 to Đakovo (D46).
	D515 to Našice. Ž4145 to Đakovo.
	A5 in Đakovo interchange via a short connecting road.
	D38 to Pleternica and Pakrac (D5). Ž4147 to Đakovo.
	Ž4292 to Đakovo and Trnava.
	D46 to Đakovo and Vinkovci.
	Ž4165 to Piškorevci and Novi Perkovci.
	Vrpolje; Ž4202 to Slavonski Brod and Bartolovci (D525) (to the west) and to Stari Mikanovci (D46) (to the east).
	Velika Kopanica; Ž4218 to Donji Andrijevci and Štitar.
	A3 in Velika Kopanica interchange.
	Ž4210 to Jaruge, Oprisavci, Trnjanski Kuti and Slavonski Brod.
	Sikirevci; Ž4220 to Gundinci.
	Slavonski Šamac
	D520 to Babina Greda interchange on A3 motorway.
	Slavonski Šamac border crossing to Bosnia and Herzegovina. The southern terminus of the road.
