= A5 (Croatia) =

Motorway in Croatia

A5 motorway
- Autocesta A5
- Slavonika
- in use under construction planned other motorways

Route information
- Part of E73
- Length: 88.6 km (55.1 mi)

Major junctions
- North end: M6 in Branjin Vrh/Ivándárda interchange D517 in Beli Manastir interchange

- D2 in Osijek interchange D7 in Đakovo interchange A3 motorway in Sredanci interchange

- South end: A 1 Svilaj Bridge border crossing with Bosnia and Herzegovina

Location
- Country: Croatia
- Counties: Osijek-Baranja, Brod-Posavina
- Major cities: Beli Manastir, Osijek, Đakovo

Highway system
- Highways in Croatia

The A5 motorway (Croatian: Autocesta A5) is a motorway in Croatia spanning 88.6 kilometres (55.1 mi). It connects Osijek, the largest city in Slavonia region, to the Croatian motorway network at the Sredanci interchange of the A3 motorway. The A5 represents a significant north–south transportation corridor in Croatia and is a part of the European route E73. The A5 motorway route also follows Pan-European corridor Vc. In addition to Osijek, the A5 motorway also passes near Đakovo and Beli Manastir.

The first section of the A5, joining the Sredanci interchange to Đakovo, was opened in 2007; the route to Osijek opened in 2009. In 2015, the first section south of the A3, from Sredanci interchange to Svilaj was opened, and the second one, extending to the Sava River and border of Bosnia and Herzegovina, along with the Svilaj bridge on the Croatia – Bosnia and Herzegovina border was opened in 2021. The section between Osijek and Beli Manastir was opened in 2022. The section between Beli Manastir and Hungary was opened in 2025.

Once the entire Pan-European corridor Vc is completed, motorists will recognize the A5's importance as a transit route. When completed, the corridor shall entail the A5 itself extended to the Hungarian border and connected to the Hungarian M6 motorway as well as Bosnia and Herzegovina's A1 motorway and the A10 motorway, completing the corridor route at the Adriatic Sea coast.

The motorway consists of two traffic lanes and an emergency lane in each driving direction separated by a central reservation. All intersections of the A5 motorway are grade separated. There are five exits and four rest areas operating along the route. The motorway is tolled using a ticket system, integrated with the A3, and each exit includes a toll plaza.

== Route description ==
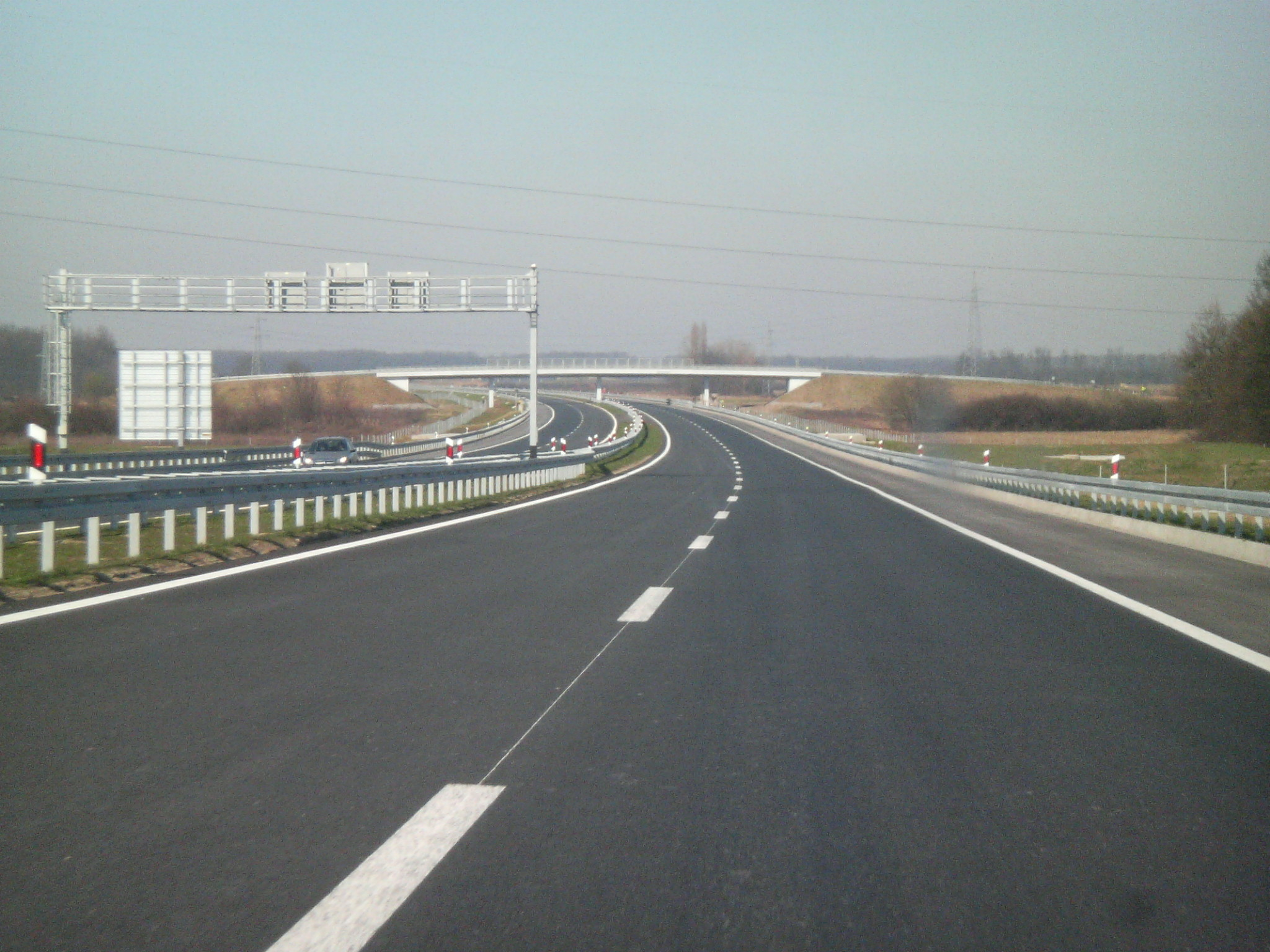
The A5 route runs in plains

The A5 is an important north–south motorway covering 59 kilometres (37 mi) in the eastern Croatian region of Slavonia, connecting the region's largest city, Osijek, to the remainder of the Croatian motorway system. The A5's southern terminus joins the A3 motorway at the Sredanci interchange; its northern terminus is near Osijek, connecting to the city's southern bypass. As a part of the road network of Croatia, the A5 is a part of European route E73. The motorway is of great importance to Croatia's economic development, especially tourism, as it represents a major southward transport route from southern Hungary. The Pan-European corridor Vc will include the A5, and its completion will highlight the importance of the A5 motorway.

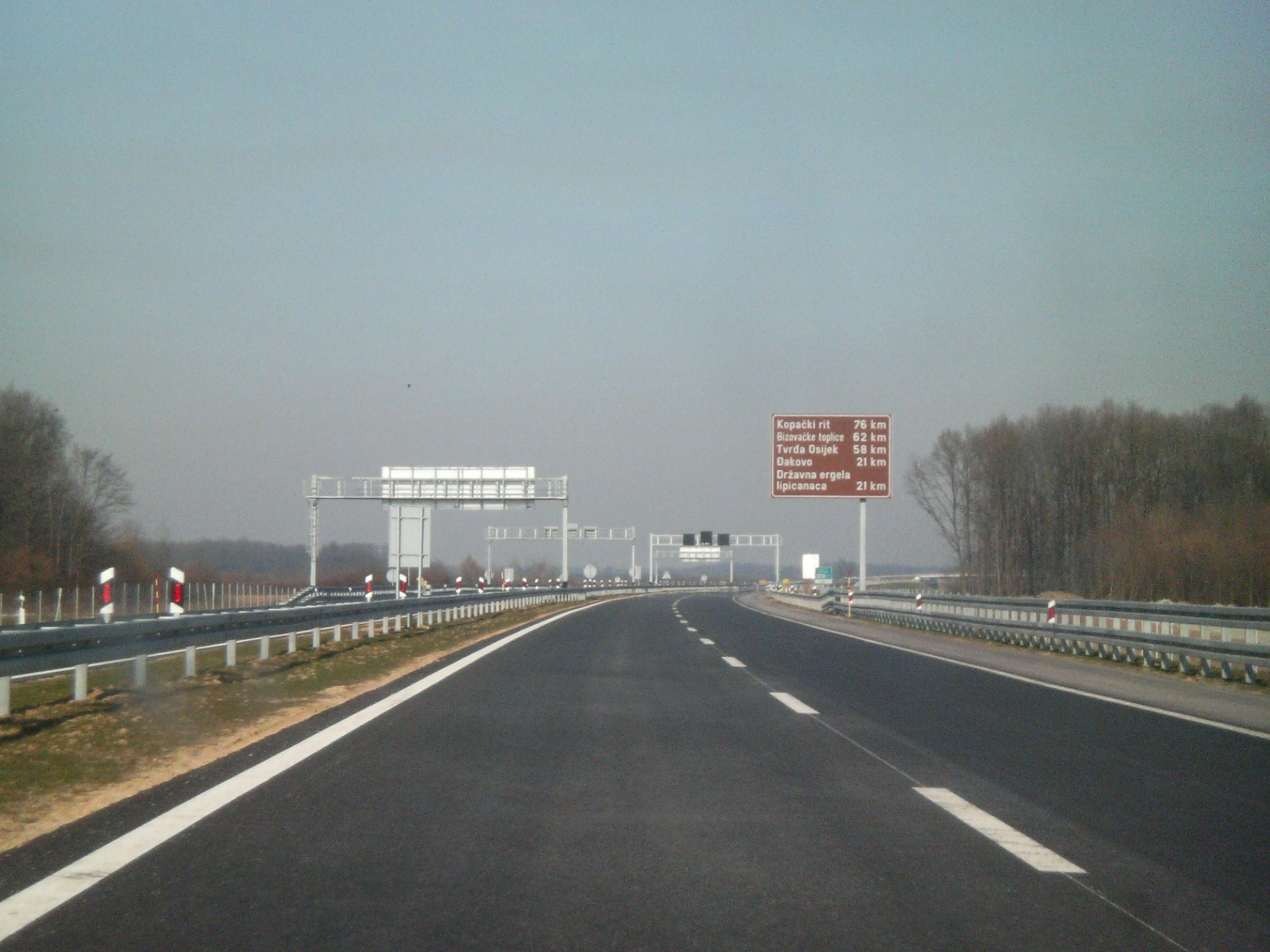
Northbound A5 near the Sredanci interchange

The cities and towns with an immediate connection to the A5 include Beli Manastir via the D517, Đakovo via the D7 and Čepin via the Ž4105 county road. The A5 motorway consists of two traffic lanes and an emergency lane in each driving direction, with carriageways separated by the median. All existing interchanges are trumpet interchanges, except for Sredanci, which is a cloverleaf. The A5 features a number of rest areas which provide various services including restrooms, filling stations and restaurants. The motorway has four interchanges, providing access to several towns and cities and the Croatian state road network. The motorway is maintained and operated by the state-owned management company Hrvatske autoceste.

An automatic traffic monitoring and guidance system is in place along the motorway. It consists of measuring, control and signaling devices, located in zones where driving conditions may vary—at interchanges, near viaducts and bridges, and areas where fog is common. The system uses variable traffic signs to communicate driving conditions, possible restrictions and other information to motorists.

The A5 motorway runs through plains crossed by a number of watercourses and railways running perpendicular to the motorway route, requiring a variety of bridges and viaducts. Particular attention to the environment is also necessary, due to water supply and natural heritage zones, as well as nearby agricultural production.

== Toll ==
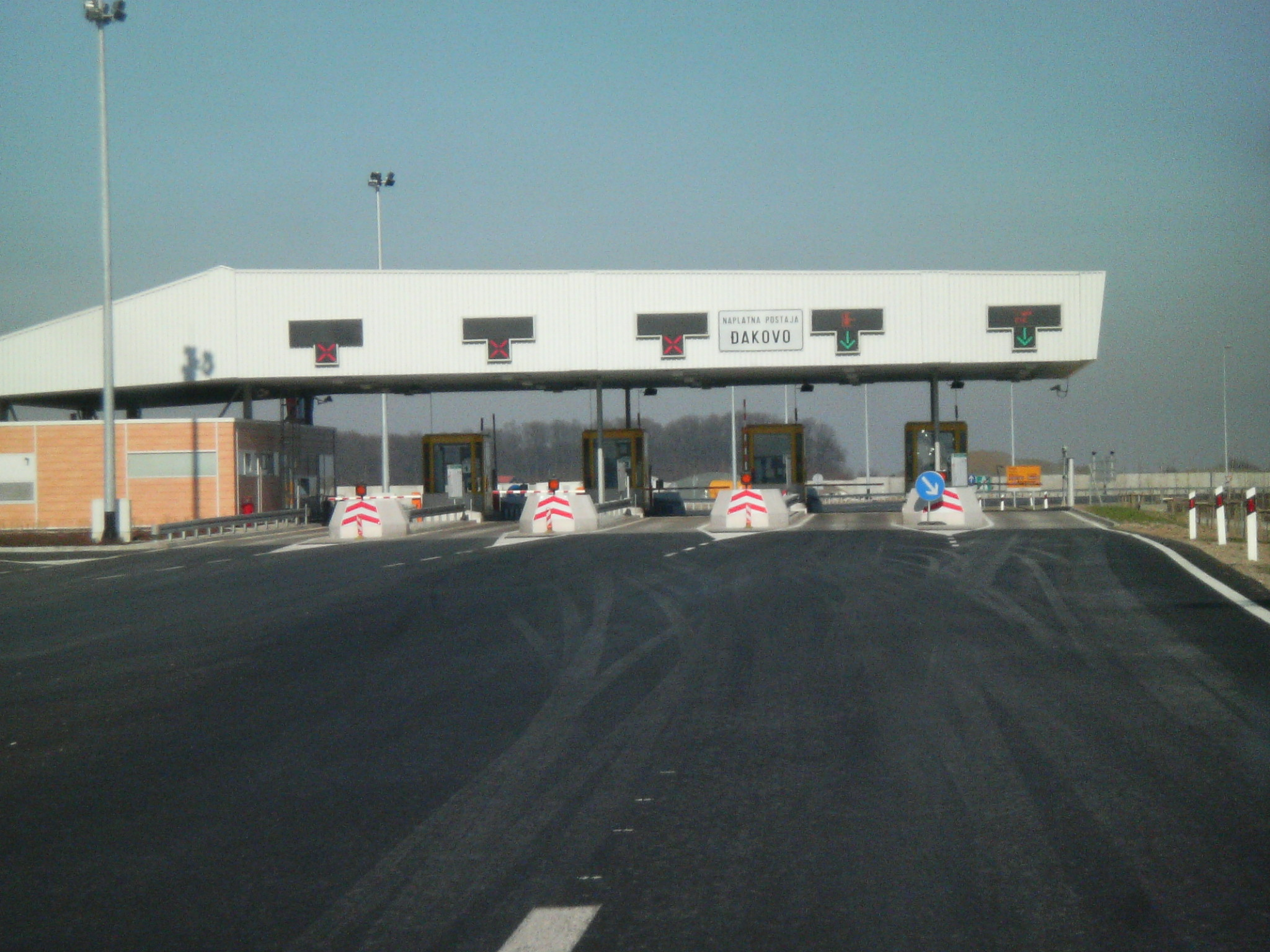
Đakovo exit toll plaza

The A5 is a tolled motorway based on the vehicle classification in Croatia using a closed toll system. Toll charged along the A5 route between Osijek and the Sredanci interchange depends on the route traveled and ranges from 4.00 kuna (0.54 euro) to 30.00 kuna (4.05 euro) for passenger cars and 13.00 kuna (1.76 euro) to 98.00 kuna (13.24 euro) for semi-trailer trucks. Motorcycles are charged approximately half of the passenger car rate. The toll is payable in either Croatian kuna or euros using major credit cards, debit cards and a number of prepaid toll collection systems. The latter include smart cards issued by the motorway operator and ENC, an electronic toll collection system which is used by motorways across Croatia, with discounted rates for dedicated lanes at toll plazas. Toll collection systems along the A5 and A3 are unified; vehicles switching from one motorway to the other at Sredanci, for example, do not pass toll plazas at the interchange.

In the first half of 2011 Hrvatske autoceste collected 508.1 million kuna (68.7 million euro) in toll revenue, an increase of 2.25% compared to the same period in 2010. However, the company reports revenue for the entire motorway network and does not provide data for individual motorways.

== History ==
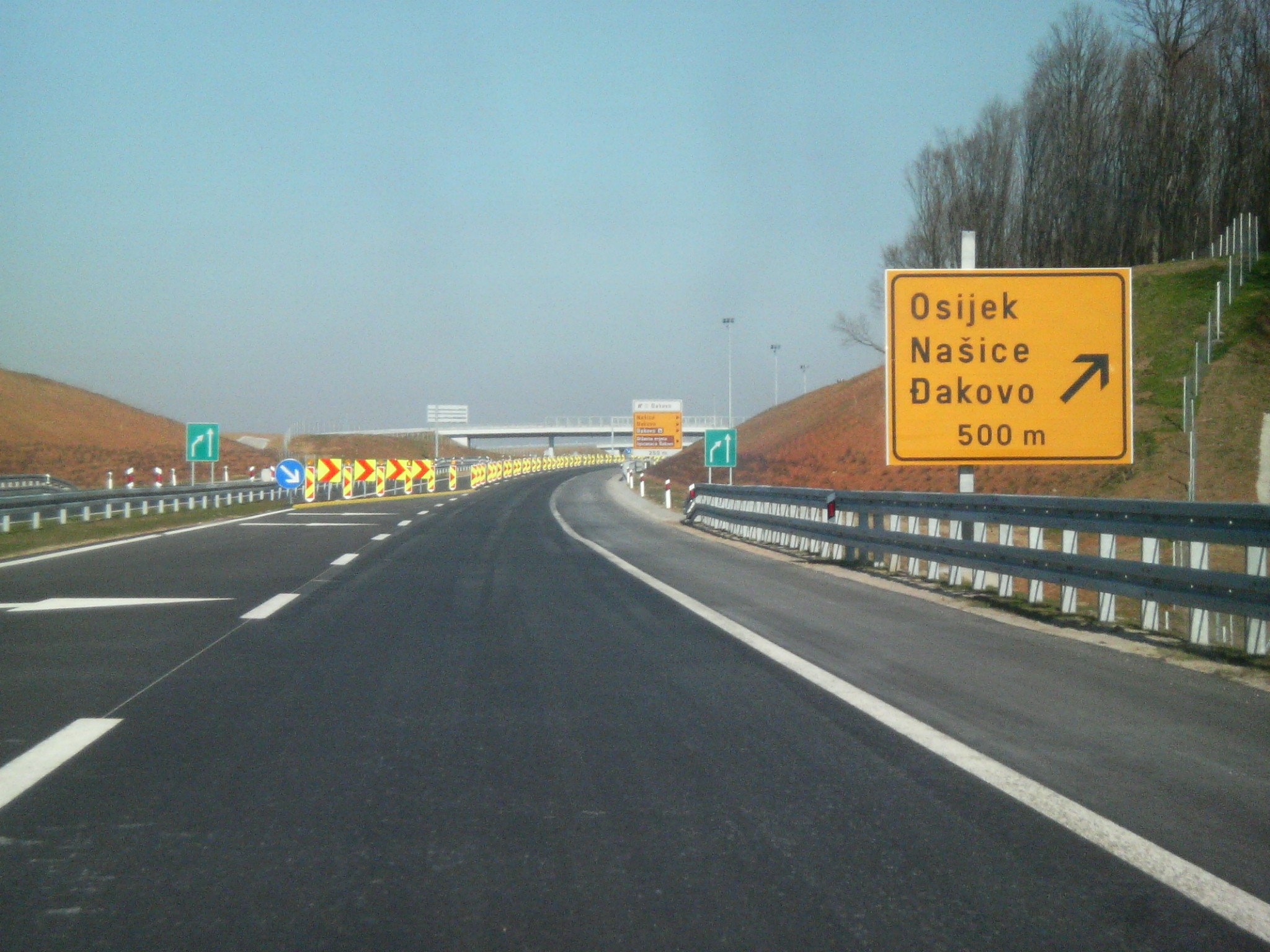
Provisional terminus near Đakovo, 2008

The first section of the A5 motorway, covering 23-kilometre (14 mi) between the Sredanci interchange and Đakovo was opened on 9 November 2007. This was Croatia's first commitment to improve transport facilities along the Pan-European transport corridor Vc, while providing a feeder motorway to the A3 toward Osijek, the largest city in the east of the country. Hrvatske autoceste invested 1.4 billion kuna (189 million euro) to construct the first section, completed in eighteen months by a consortium of Croatian construction companies. When the first section opened, construction on a second stretch of the A5, reaching 32.5-kilometre (20.2 mi) between Đakovo and Osijek, was announced on 15 November, with completion scheduled for December 2008.

The route extension to Osijek was delayed by four months, but opened on 17 April 2009. The construction works were completed in 17 months at a price of 2.13 billion kuna (287 million euro). Completion of this section marked the start of toll collection on the A5 motorway. The motorway is nicknamed "Slavonika", presumably because it spans Slavonia from north to south, although the Sredanci interchange with the A3 motorway is also called Slavonika by some media.

Svilaj bridge and Svilaj border crossing are 3.5-kilometre (2.2 mi) long part of motorway which has been finished in July 2020 and opened in September 2021. The construction of the bridge across the Drava continued in 2016 and finished in 2018, while the next section to bridge Halasica and Beli Manastir.

The contract on the construction of the A5 motorway section Halasica-Beli Manastir, on the international traffic Vc corridor, worth HRK 443 million without VAT, was signed on 28 April 2020 between Hrvatske autoceste and the contractors. Only one offer was received for the tender, business associations of the companies "Osijek Koteks" and GP "Krk", which plan is to complete the 17.5-kilometre (10.9 mi) section by the middle of 2022. The project is co-financed by the European Bank for Reconstruction and Development and the Croatian Bank for Reconstruction and Development.

The section between the Osijek interchange, across the 2,507 m (8,225 ft) Drava bridge, to the Sudaraš exit at Beli Manastir was opened in December 2022, at a total cost of 126 million EUR. In 2020, the plan was to complete the A5 motorway to the border with Hungary by the end of 2023. In 2022, this was planned as a 5.0 km (3.1 mi) section. On 31 August 2023, the procurement was completed as a contract was signed to build that section, which mandated an 18-month completion time following the introduction of the contractor to the construction.

The section between the Beli Manastir interchange, across the 318 m (1,043 ft) 135th Baranja brigade HV viaduct, to the Branjin Vrh at the Hungarian border was opened in October 2025, at a total cost of 46 million EUR. In general, motorways in Croatia have led to a positive economic impact on the cities and towns they connected, as well as aiding tourism in Croatia.

== Traffic volume ==
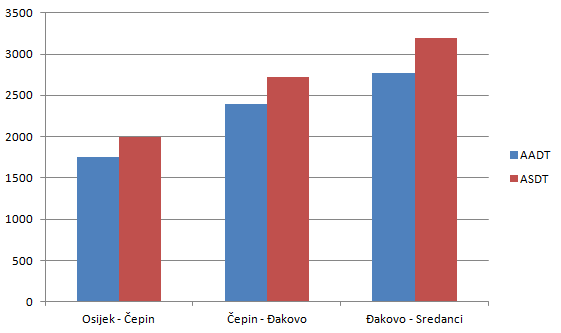
2010 A5 traffic volume by section

Traffic is regularly counted and reported by Hrvatske autoceste, the operator of the motorway, and is published by Hrvatske ceste. The variations between the AADT and the ASDT traffic volumes are attributed to the fact that the motorway carries certain tourist traffic from Hungary to the Croatian motorway network and ultimately to the Adriatic Sea. On average the motorway carries 15% increased volume of traffic during summer months. As the Hungarian M6 motorway is gradually extended towards the Croatian border and the A5 motorway's northern terminus, the number of tourists traveling along this route in summer months is increasing.

A5 traffic volume details
Road	Counting site	AADT	ASDT	Notes
A5	2515 Osijek south	2,016	2,376	Between Osijek and Čepin interchanges. Average daily traffic figure is provided instead of AADT.
A5	3620 Čepin south	2,623	3,172	Between Čepin and Đakovo interchanges. Average daily traffic figure is provided instead of AADT.
A5	3616 Đakovo south	3,087	3,757	Between Đakovo and Sredanci interchanges.
A5	3629 Interchange Sredanci south	255	232	Between Sredanci and Svilaj interchanges.

== Rest areas ==
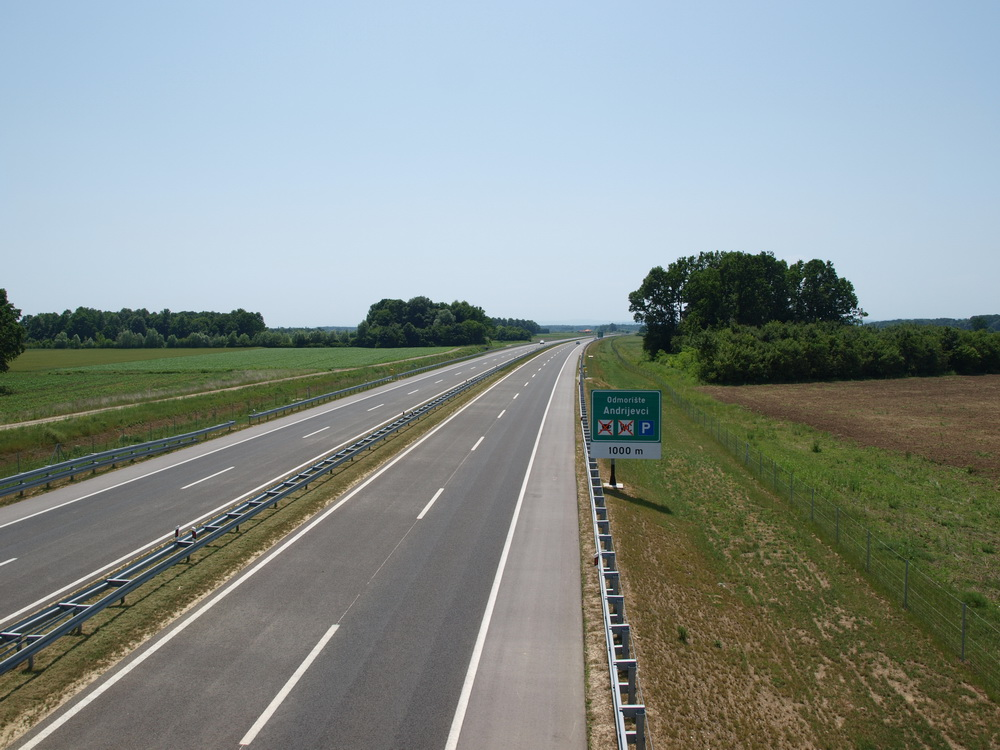
A5 approach to Andrijevci rest area

There are four rest areas along the A5 motorway. Legislation identifies four types of rest areas: A-type rest areas comprise a full range of amenities, including a filling station, a restaurant and a hotel or motel; B-type rest areas have no lodging; C-type rest areas are very common and include a filling station and a café, but no restaurants or accommodations; D-type rest areas only offer parking spaces, possibly picnicking tables and benches and restrooms. Most rest areas along the A2 motorway generally follow this ranking system, although some offer extra services. Many filling stations along the Croatian motorway network have small convenience stores, and some offer LPG fuel.

The primary motorway operator, Hrvatske autoceste (HAC), leases the A, B and C type rest areas to various operators through public tenders. There is a single such rest area operator on the A5 motorway: Petrol. The rest area operators are not permitted to sub-lease fuel operations. The A5 motorway rest areas are accessible from both directions of the motorway and operate 24 hours a day, seven days a week.

List of A5 motorway rest areas
County	km	Name	Operators	Type	Notes
Osijek‑Baranja	42.2	Beketinci	OMV	C	Beketinci rest area contains parking spaces only. As of September 2011, a filling station and a café are under construction at the rest area.
Osijek‑Baranja	52.5	Štrosmajerovac		D	Štrosmajerovac rest area contains parking spaces only.
Osijek‑Baranja	68.4	Ivandvor	Petrol	B	Ivandvor rest area facilities comprise a filling station, a restaurant, a café, restrooms and picnicking areas.
Brod‑Posavina	78.6	Andrijevci		D	Andrijevci rest area contains a café and restrooms.
1.000 mi = 1.609 km; 1.000 km = 0.621 mi

== Exit list ==
County	km	Exit	Name	Destination	Notes
Osijek-Baranja
Osijek-Baranja	0.0	Border crossing within the EU	Branjin Vrh border crossing	M6; E73	Connection to border crossing to Hungary as the M6 motorway towards Budapest. The northern terminus of the motorway and of the European route E73 concurrency; It was opened on October 6, 2025 .
Osijek-Baranja	5.2	1	Beli Manastir	D517	Connection to Beli Manastir, and (via the D7) Duboševica border crossing to Hungary; Opened in December 2022.
Osijek-Baranja	6.2		Sudaraž toll plaza		
Osijek-Baranja		2	Čeminac		Planned connection to Čeminac
Osijek-Baranja		Halasica Viaduct			
Osijek-Baranja	23.5	Drava Bridge			
Osijek-Baranja		Josipovac Viaduct			
Osijek-Baranja	29.5	3	Osijek	D2 E73	Connection to Osijek (south), Bizovac and Belišće (via the D34)
Osijek-Baranja	38.4	4	Čepin	Ž4105	Connection to Čepin
Osijek-Baranja	42.2		Beketinci rest area		
Osijek-Baranja	52.5		Štrosmajerovac rest area		
Osijek-Baranja	62.0	5	Đakovo	D7	Connection to Đakovo and Vrpolje
Osijek-Baranja	68.4		Ivandvor rest area		
Brod-Posavina	73.7	HŽ Andrijevci Viaduct			
Brod-Posavina		6	Andrijevci		Planned connection to Andrijevci
Brod-Posavina	78.6		Andrijevci rest area		
Brod-Posavina	85.0	7	Sredanci	A3 E70 E73	Connection to the A3 motorway (E70) connecting Slavonski Brod and Zagreb (to the west) and Županja and Belgrade, Serbia (to the east).
Brod-Posavina			Svilaj toll plaza		
Brod-Posavina	86.8	8	Svilaj	Ž4210	Connection to Svilaj; Opened in 2014.
Brod-Posavina	88.5		Svilaj border crossing	A1 E73	Svilaj border crossing to Bosnia and Herzegovina; The route continues into Bosnia and Herzegovina as the A1 motorway towards Sarajevo. The southern terminus of the motorway; Opened in September 2021.
1.000 mi = 1.609 km; 1.000 km = 0.621 mi: Concurrency terminus; Incomplete access; Unopened

== See also ==
- International E-road network
- Transport in Croatia
