= D212 road =

Road in Croatia

D212 state road

Route information
- Part of
- Length: 22.1 km (13.7 mi)

Major junctions
- From: Batina border crossing to Serbia
- To: D7 near Kozarac

Location
- Country: Croatia
- Counties: Osijek-Baranja

Highway system
- Highways in Croatia

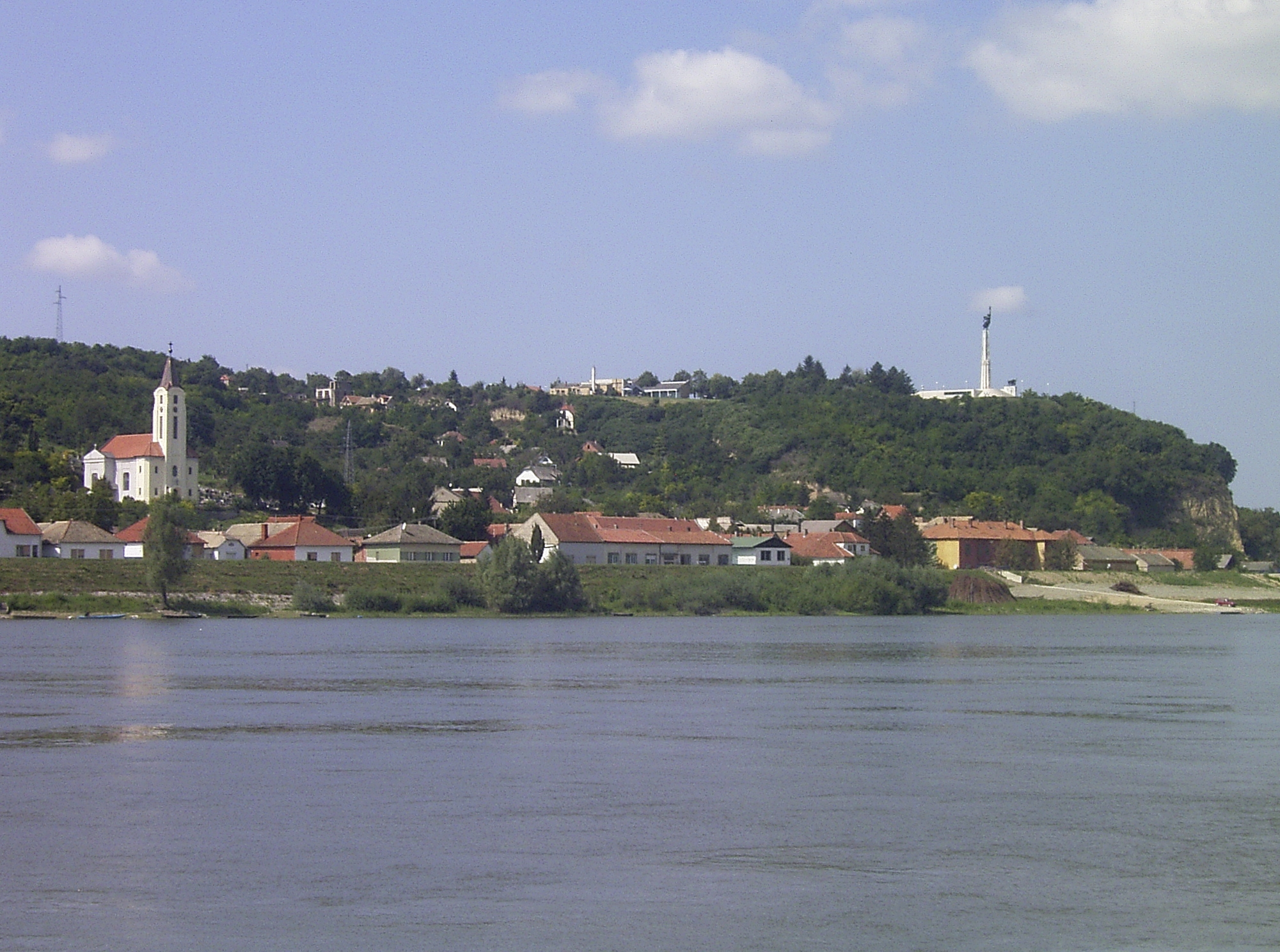
Batina, at the eastern terminus of the D212 road

D212 is a state road in Baranya region of Croatia connecting Batina and nearby border crossing to Bezdan, Vojvodina, Serbia to D7 state road north of Čeminac. The road is 22.1 km (13.7 mi) long.

The road, as well as all other state roads in Croatia, is managed and maintained by Hrvatske ceste, state owned company.

== Traffic volume ==
Traffic is regularly counted and reported by Hrvatske ceste, operator of the road.

D212 traffic volume
Road	Counting site	AADT	ASDT	Notes
D212	2502 Suza	2,195	2,440	Adjacent to the Ž4037 junction.

== Road junctions and populated areas ==
D212 junctions/populated areas
Type	Slip roads/Notes
	Batina border crossing to Serbia. The route extends to Bezdan, Vojvodina, Serbia. The eastern terminus of the road.
	Batina; Ž4018 to Gajić and Topolje.
	Zmajevac; Ž4259 to the Ž4018 county road.
	Suza
	Kneževi Vinogradi; Ž4037 to Kotlina and Podolje.
	Ž4042 to Grabovac, Vardarac and Bilje.
	D7 to Beli Manastir (D517) and Duboševica border crossing to Mohács, Hungary (to the north) and to Osijek (D2) and the A5 motorway Osijek interchange (to the south). The western terminus of the road.
