= Edin Gačić =

Bosnian serial killer (1976–2019)

- Born: 1 September 1976; Banja Luka, SR Bosnia and Herzegovina, SFR Yugoslavia
- Died: 12 February 2019 (aged 42); Kiseljak, Bosnia and Herzegovina
- Conviction: Murder
- Penalty: 14 years (first conviction); 20 years (second conviction)

Details
- Victims: 4
- Span of crimes: 1998–2019
- Country: Bosnia and Herzegovina

Edin Gačić (1 September 1976 – 12 February 2019) was a Bosnian serial killer who murdered four people between 1998 and 2019. He is the only known serial killer in Bosnian and Herzegovinian history.

== Early life and crimes ==
Gačić was born in Banja Luka in SR Bosnia and Herzegovina in 1976. According to his statements given to police agencies during his arrest, he was sexually abused as a child.

During the Bosnian War, he served in the El-Mudžahid military detachment of the 3rd Corps of ARBiH from 1993 to 1995. After the war, he killed his fellow soldier Ismet Gunić in 1998, for which he was sentenced to 14 years in prison the following year.

While on a weekend leave from prison, he shot and killed his mother, Sifeta, in the Bosnian city of Zenica in August 2002. The court subsequently handed down a cumulative sentence of 20 years in prison for Gačić. He returned to prison, being released again 15 years later.

After his release from prison, he did not commit any crimes and was staying in Banja Luka until he sold his apartment and moved to Konjic. However, in 2019 he shot and killed two other men, Suad Sultanić, who was his neighbour and a shop owner in Konjic, and later Mahir Begić, who was a policeman, in Tarčin.

== Death ==
After the murder of Begić, the State Investigation and Protection Agency issued a nationwide manhunt for Gačić. After eight days of searching, he was found in the Lepenica settlement near Kiseljak. Gačić engaged the police in an armed confrontation; he had the pistol of Mahir Begić, and he slightly injured a police officer. He was shot and killed on 12 February 2019.
