= D520 road =

Road in Croatia

D520 state road

Route information
- Length: 7.6 km (4.7 mi)

Major junctions
- From: A3 in Babina Greda interchange
- To: D7 in Slavonski Šamac

Location
- Country: Croatia
- Counties: Vukovar-Syrmia, Brod-Posavina
- Major cities: Babina Greda, Slavonski Šamac

Highway system
- Highways in Croatia

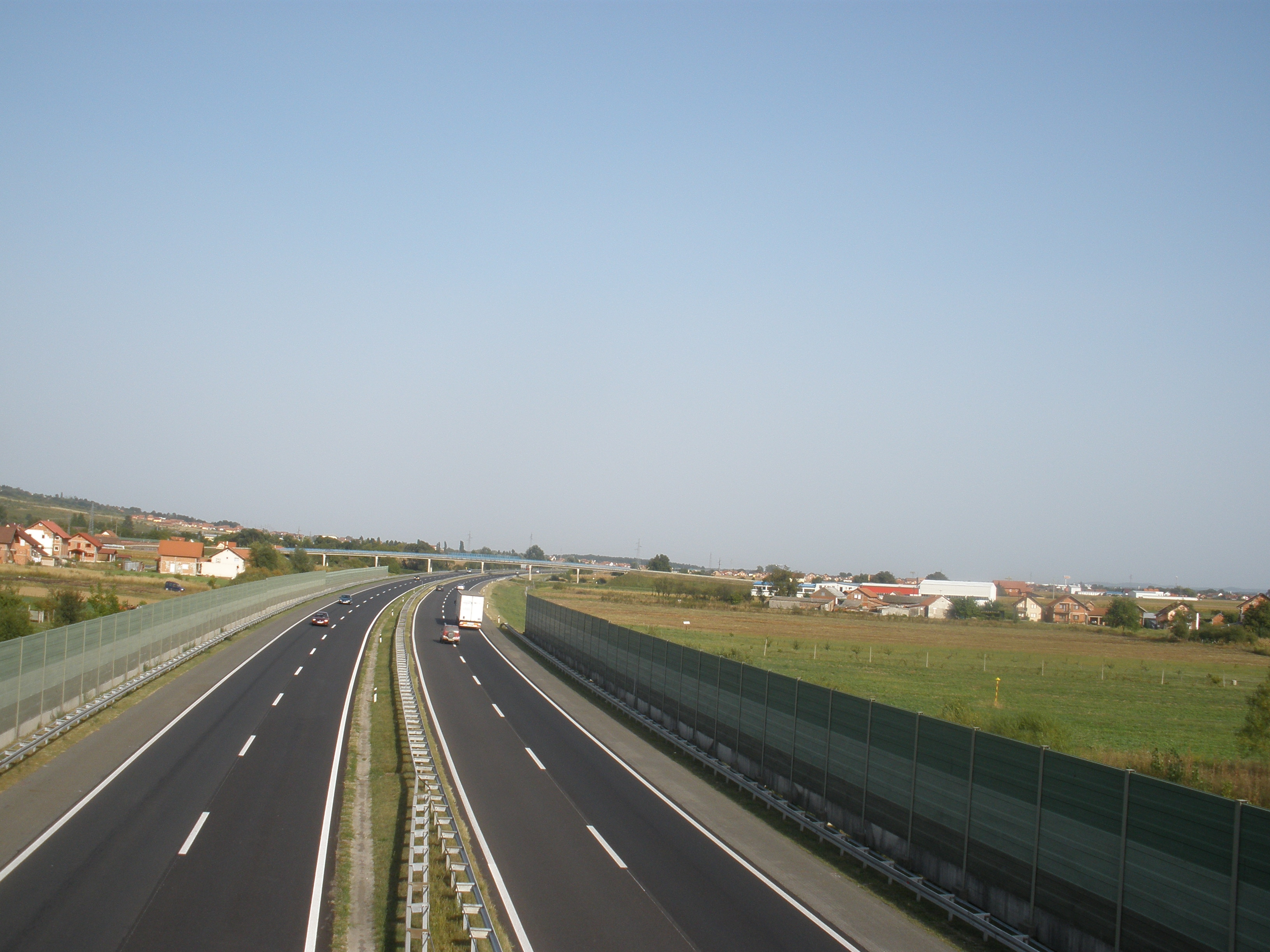
A3 motorway, connected to the D7 road via D520

D520 is a state road in Slavonia region of Croatia, connecting the A3 motorway Babina Greda interchange to Slavonski Šamac, Babina Greda and D7. The road is 7.6 km (4.7 mi) long.

The road, as well as all other state roads in Croatia, is managed and maintained by Hrvatske Ceste, state owned company.

== Traffic volume ==
The D520 state road traffic volume is not reported by Hrvatske Ceste, however they regularly count and report traffic volume on the A3 motorway Babina Greda interchange, which connects to the D520 road only, thus permitting the D520 road traffic volume to be accurately calculated. The report includes no information on ASDT volumes.

D520 traffic volume
Road	Counting site	AADT	ASDT	Notes
A3	Babina Greda interchange	161	n/a	Eastbound A3 traffic leaving the motorway at the interchange.
A3	Babina Greda interchange	205	n/a	Eastbound A3 traffic entering the motorway at the interchange.
A3	Babina Greda interchange	209	n/a	Westbound A3 traffic leaving the motorway at the interchange.
A3	Babina Greda interchange	156	n/a	Westbound A3 traffic entering the motorway at the interchange.
D520	Babina Greda interchange	731	n/a	Total traffic entering/leaving the A1 motorway from/to D520.

== Road junctions and populated areas ==
D520 junctions/populated areas
Type	Slip roads/Notes
	A3 in Babina Greda interchange, to Zagreb and Slavonski Brod (to the west) and to Županja and Belgrade, Serbia (to the east). The northern terminus of the road.
	Babina Greda
	Slavonski Šamac; D7 to Vrpolje (to the north) and Slavonski Šamac border crossing (to the south). The southern terminus of the road.

== See also ==
- A3 motorway
