= Ivan Filipović =

Ivan Filipović may refer to:

- Ivan Filipović (teacher), Croatian educator, writer and activist
- Ivan Filipović Grčić, Croatian priest and soldier
- Ivan Filipović (footballer), Croatian football player
