= Sredanci interchange =

- Croatian: Čvor Sredanci
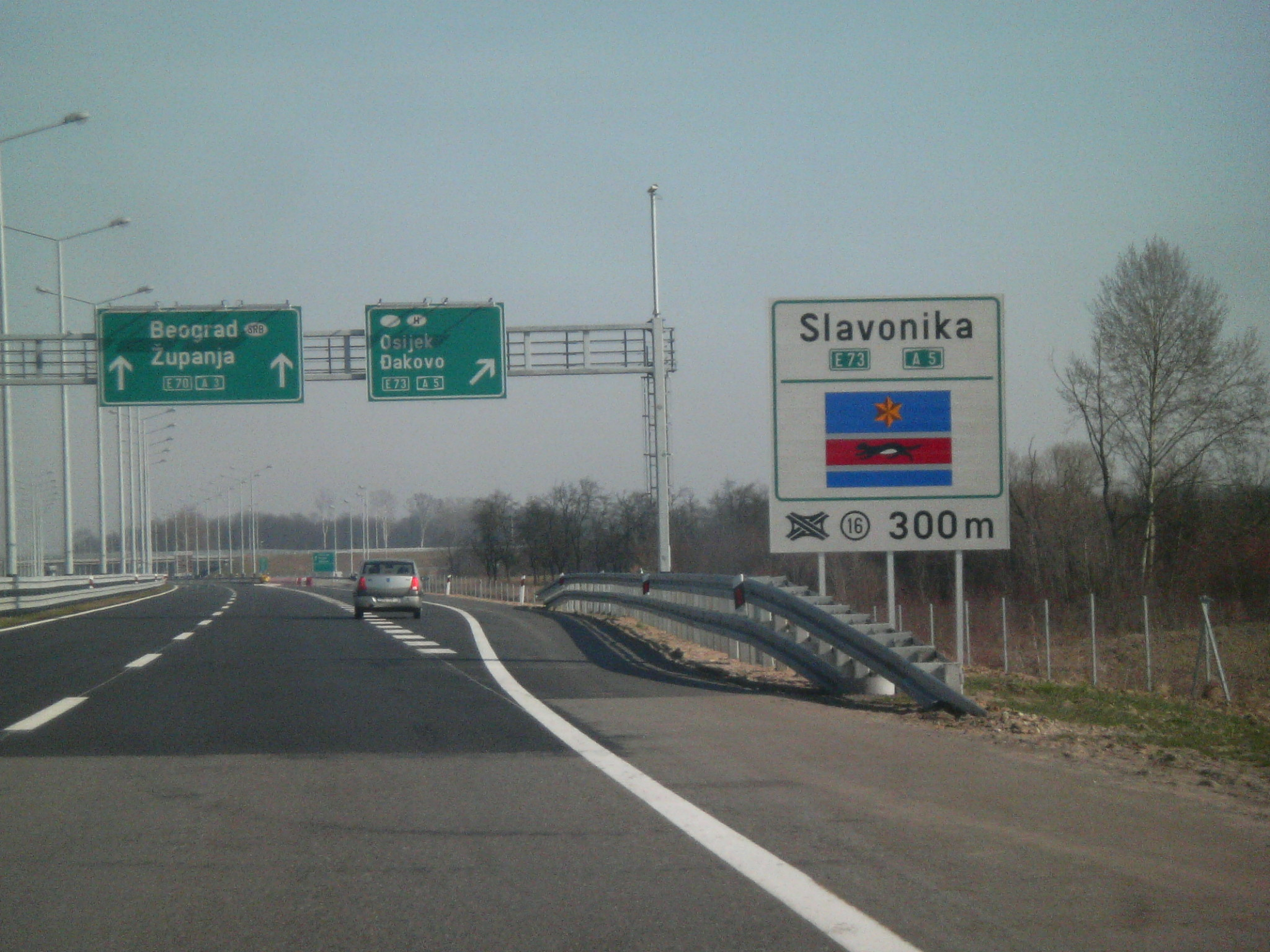
- Sredanci interchange, approach along the eastbound A3
- Interactive map of Sredanci interchange

Location
- Sredanci, Croatia
- Coordinates: 45.145°N 18.311806°E
- Roads at junction: A3 / E70 A5 / E73

Construction
- Type: Cloverleaf interchange
- Constructed: 2007
- Opened: 2007 (partially); 2015 (fully)

The Sredanci interchange (Croatian: Čvor Sredanci) is a cloverleaf interchange east of Slavonski Brod, Croatia. It is named after nearby village of Sredanci. The interchange connects the A5 motorway to the A3 motorway facilitating a link between the city of Osijek and the remainder of the Croatian motorway system. The interchange is a part of Pan-European corridors Vc and X. It also represents a junction of European routes E70 and E73.

There are no exits from the motorway system available at the interchange, thereby allowing the A3 and A5 motorways to have an integrated toll collection system, joined at the interchange.

== See also ==
- International E-road network
- Transport in Croatia
