= Široko Polje =

- Village (Selo)
- Location within Osijek-Baranja County Location within Croatia Location within Europe
- Country: Croatia

Area
  - Total: 5.9 sq mi (15.3 km^{2})

Population (2021)
  - Total: 799
  - Density: 135/sq mi (52.2/km^{2})
- Time zone: UTC+1 (CET)
  - Summer (DST): UTC+2 (CEST)

Široko Polje is a village in Croatia. It is connected by the D7 highway.
