= Kuševac =

- Village (Selo)
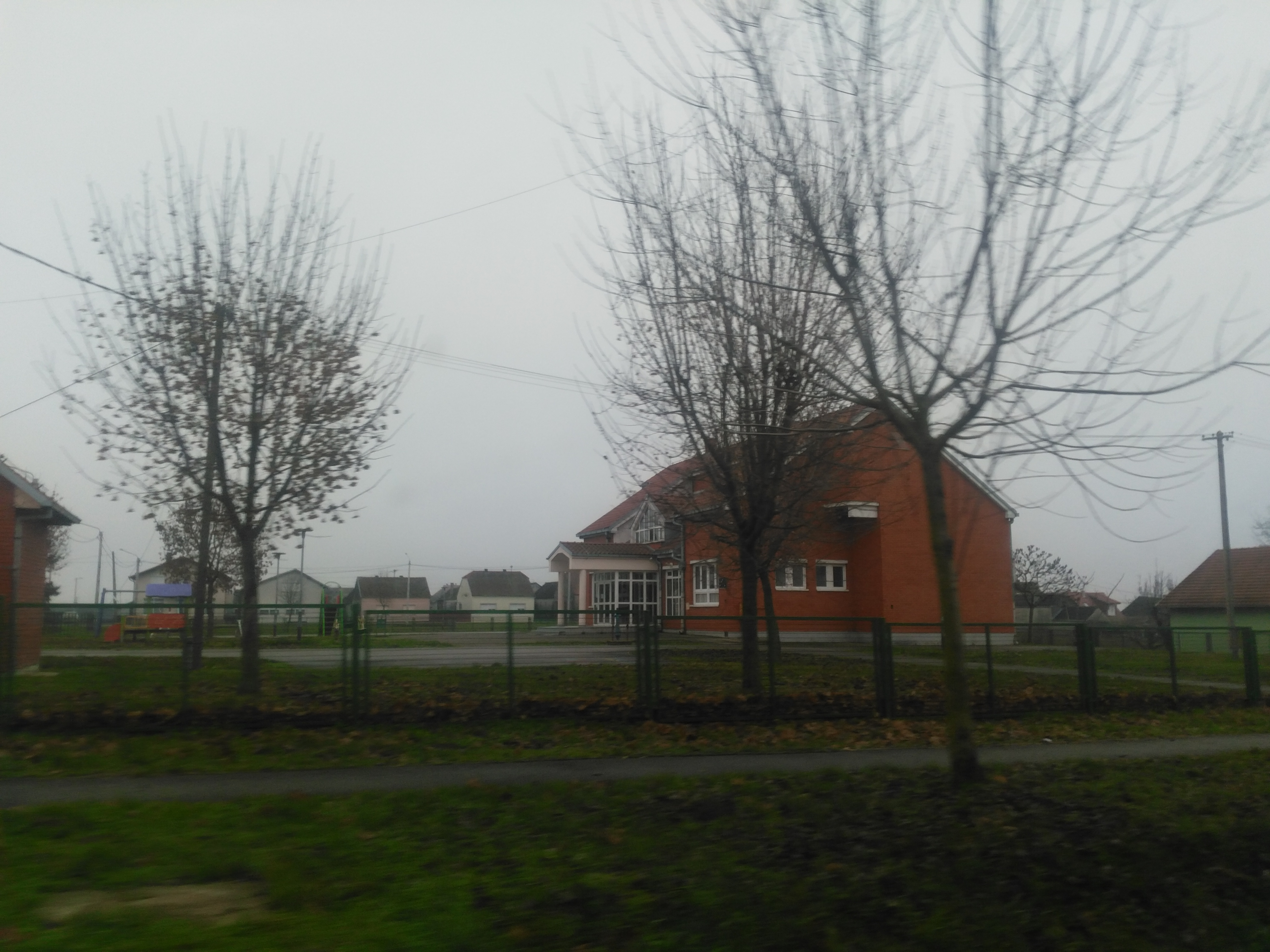

- Location within Osijek-Baranja County Location within Croatia Location within Europe
- Country: Croatia
- County: Osijek-Baranja County

Area
  - Total: 2.1 km^{2} (0.81 sq mi)

Population (2021)
  - Total: 897
  - Density: 430/km^{2} (1,100/sq mi)
- Time zone: UTC+1 (CET)
  - Summer (DST): UTC+2 (CEST)

Kuševac is a village in Croatia. It is connected by the D7 highway.
