= Svilaj =

Coordinates: 45°7′28″N 18°17′52″E

- village
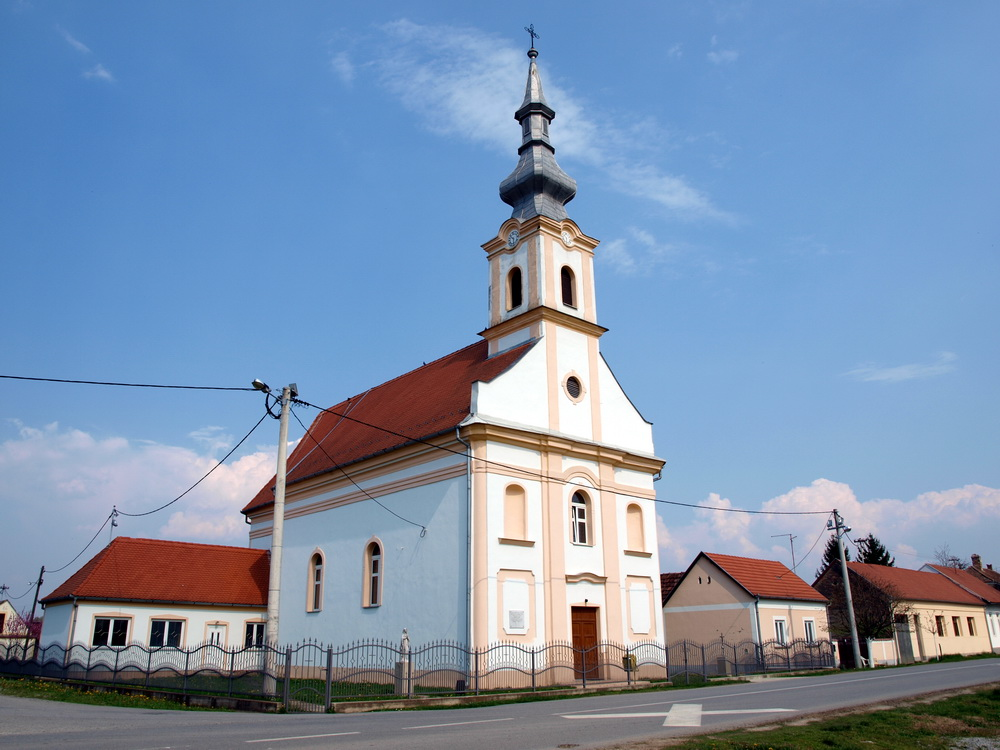
- Church in Svilaj
- Interactive map of Svilaj
- Country: Croatia
- County: Brod-Posavina

Area
  - Total: 6.6 km^{2} (2.5 sq mi)

Population (2021)
  - Total: 216
  - Density: 33/km^{2} (85/sq mi)
- Time zone: UTC+1 (CET)
  - Summer (DST): UTC+2 (CEST)
- Postal code: 35213 Oprisavci
- Area code: 035

Svilaj is a settlement in the Croatian municipality of Oprisavci (Brod-Posavina County). According to the 2001 census, the settlement has 290 inhabitants. Svilaj's importance lies in the border checkpoint and a bridge over the nearby Sava river, which bears the internationally important freeway Pan-European Corridor Vc.

== See also ==
- Donji Svilaj
