= Tarčin =

- Village
- Location within Bosnia and Herzegovina
- Coordinates: 43°48′N 18°06′E
- Country: Bosnia and Herzegovina
- Entity: Federation of Bosnia and Herzegovina
- Canton: Sarajevo
- Municipality: Hadžići

Area
  - Total: 3.36 km^{2} (1.30 sq mi)

Population (2013)
  - Total: 1,113
  - Density: 331/km^{2} (858/sq mi)
- Time zone: UTC+1 (CET)
  - Summer (DST): UTC+2 (CEST)
- Postal code: 71244

Tarčin (Serbian Cyrillic: Тарчин) is a village in the municipality of Hadžići, Bosnia and Herzegovina.

It is located around 30 km west of Sarajevo in the Sarajevo Canton within the Federation of Bosnia and Herzegovina. European route E73, a European highway between Hungary and the Adriatic Sea (Croatia) runs through Tarčin.

== Demographics ==
According to the 2013 census, its population was 1,113.

Ethnicity in 2013
| Ethnicity | Number | Percentage |
|---|---|---|
| Bosniaks | 956 | 85.9% |
| Croats | 55 | 4.9% |
| Serbs | 17 | 1.5% |
| other/undeclared | 85 | 7.6% |
| Total | 1,113 | 100% |
