= Ivan Filipović (teacher) =

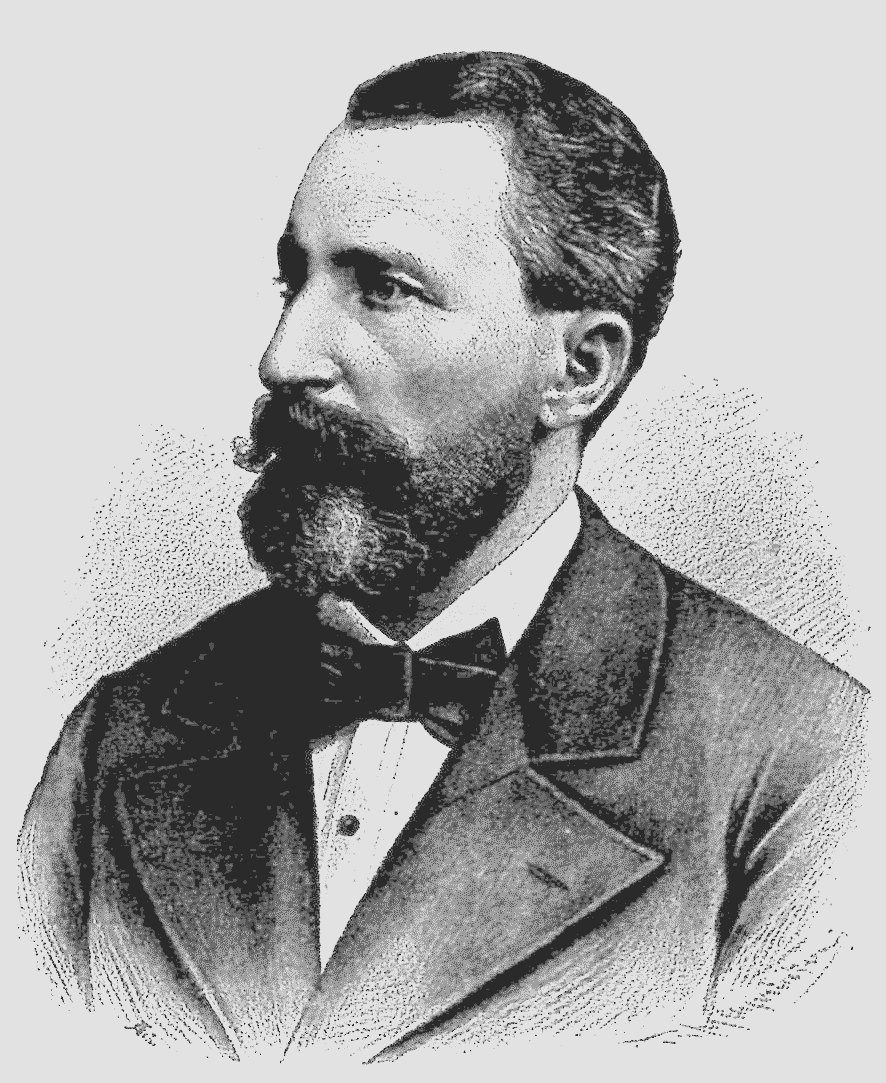
Ivan Filipović in 1892

Ivan Filipović (24 July 1823 – 28 October 1895) was a Croatian teacher, writer and lexicographer.

Born in Velika Kopanica, he was educated to become a teacher in Vinkovci and Sremska Mitrovica, where he also started as a teacher's apprentice in 1842. He became a teacher in Nova Gradiška in 1846, later moving to Zagreb, then to Požega and then again to Zagreb in 1863, where in turn he would remain until his retirement. In 1875 he became the school superintendent of the Zagreb County.

Filipović was an avid organizer of teachers, having founded a teachers' cooperative in 1865, co-founding the Croatian Pedagogic and Literary Board in 1871, and later the Union of Croatian Teacher Societies in 1885.

He worked to modernize the Croatian school system, and in 1865 he drafted a document that would serve as a basis for the first Croatian public school law passed in 1874 in the Kingdom of Croatia-Slavonia. Filipović advocated for the freedom and autonomy of schools as well as for women's education, which brought him in conflict with the authorities, such as the government of Khuen Hedervary as well as the Catholic Church.

Filipović wrote poetry as part of the Illyrian movement, and one of his patriotic songs led to him getting jailed during the time of the Bach's absolutism. He also wrote love poems, as well as a number of works of prose and poetry for children.

He also wrote a Croatian-German dictionary, an encyclopedia of pedagogy, and founded or edited a number of journals.

Filipović retired in 1887 and died in Zagreb in 1895.

Boris Papandopulo founded the Teachers' Choir "Ivan Filipović" in 1932.

The Croatian government named its national award for educational workers after Ivan Filipović. First created in 1964 by the Croatian Pedagogical and Literary Board, since 1967 it has been awarded by the Croatian Parliament. It has since become an annual award and a lifetime achievement award.
