= Batina =

Batina Kiskőszeg
- Village (Selo)
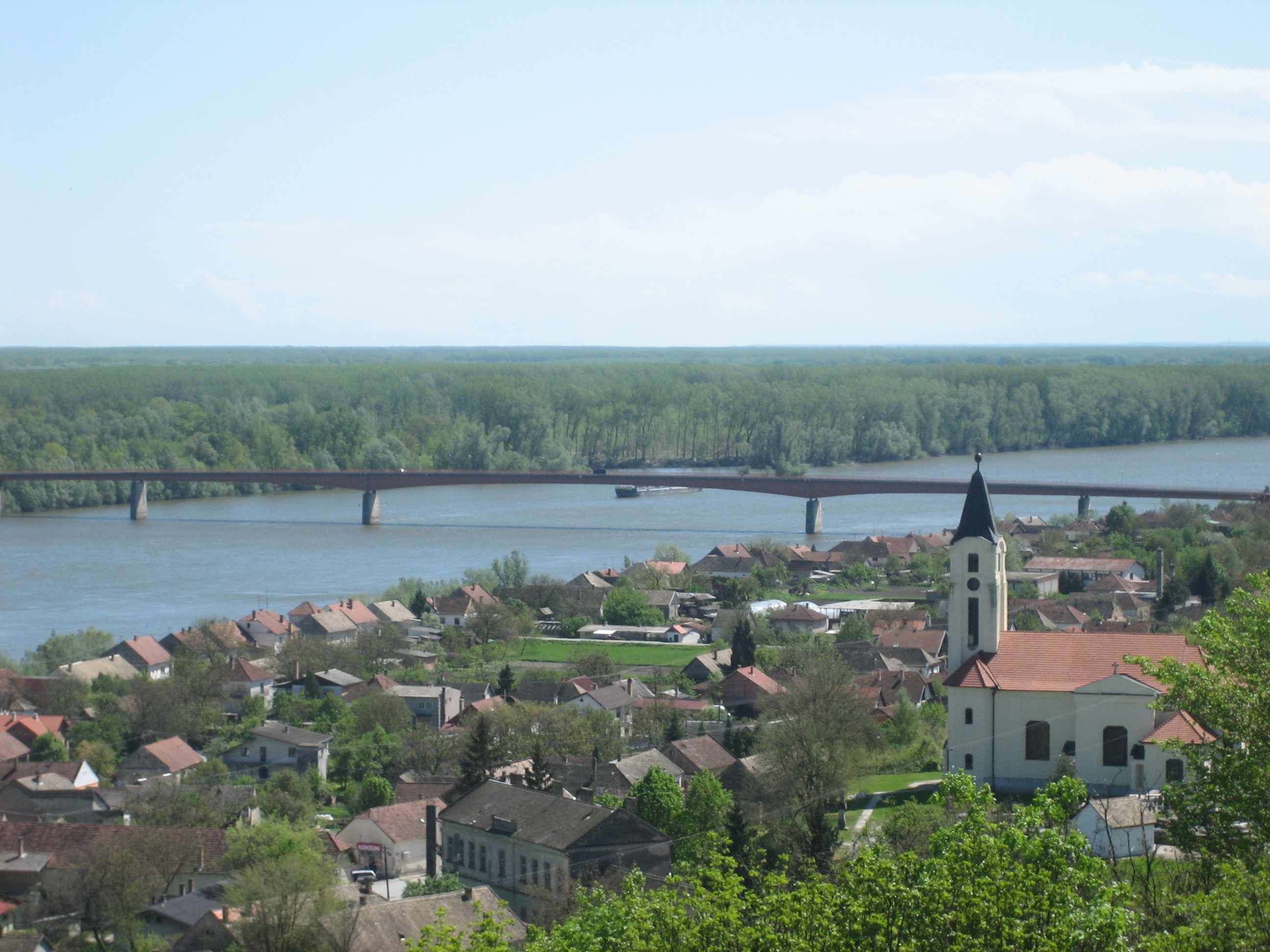
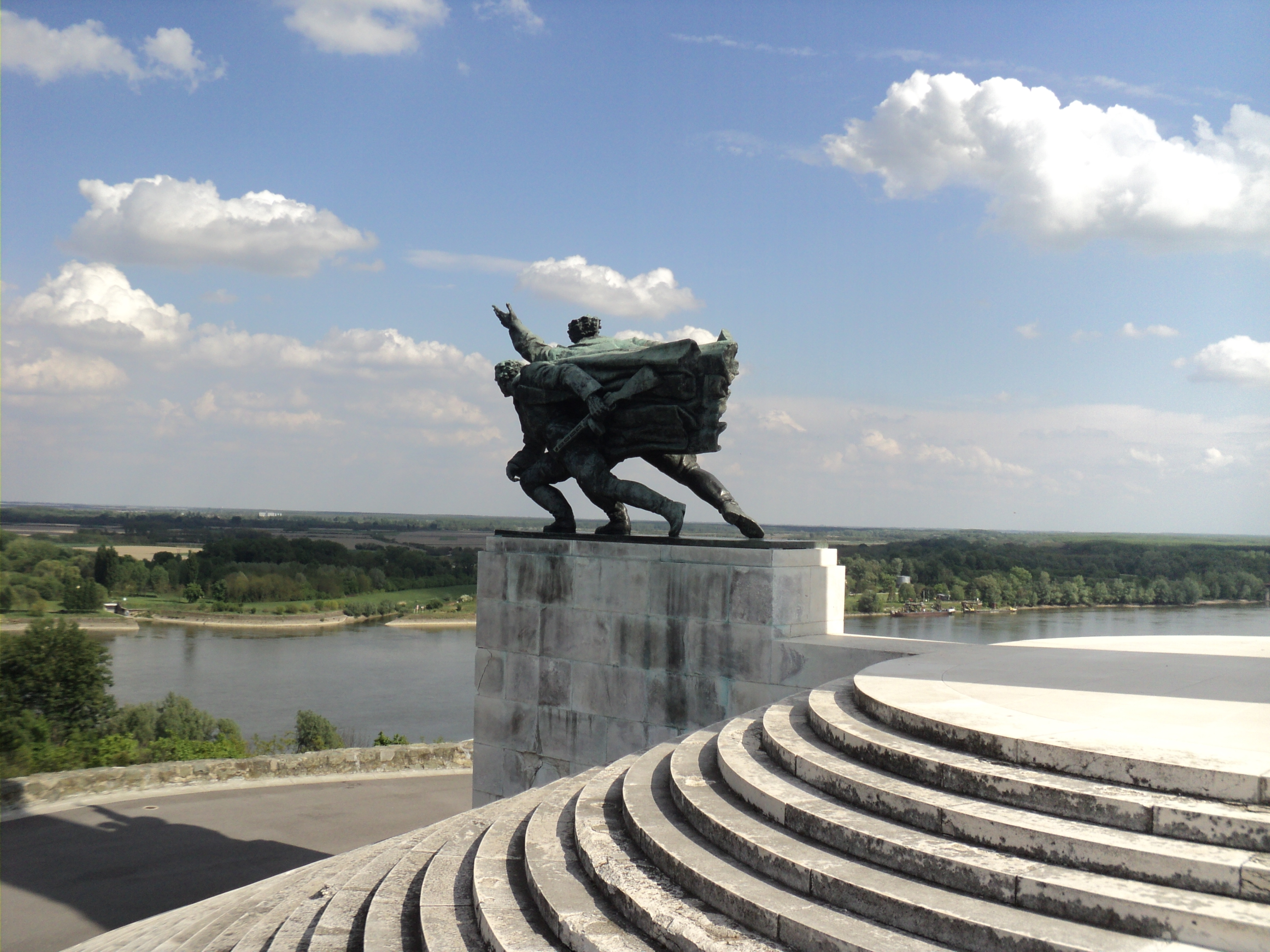
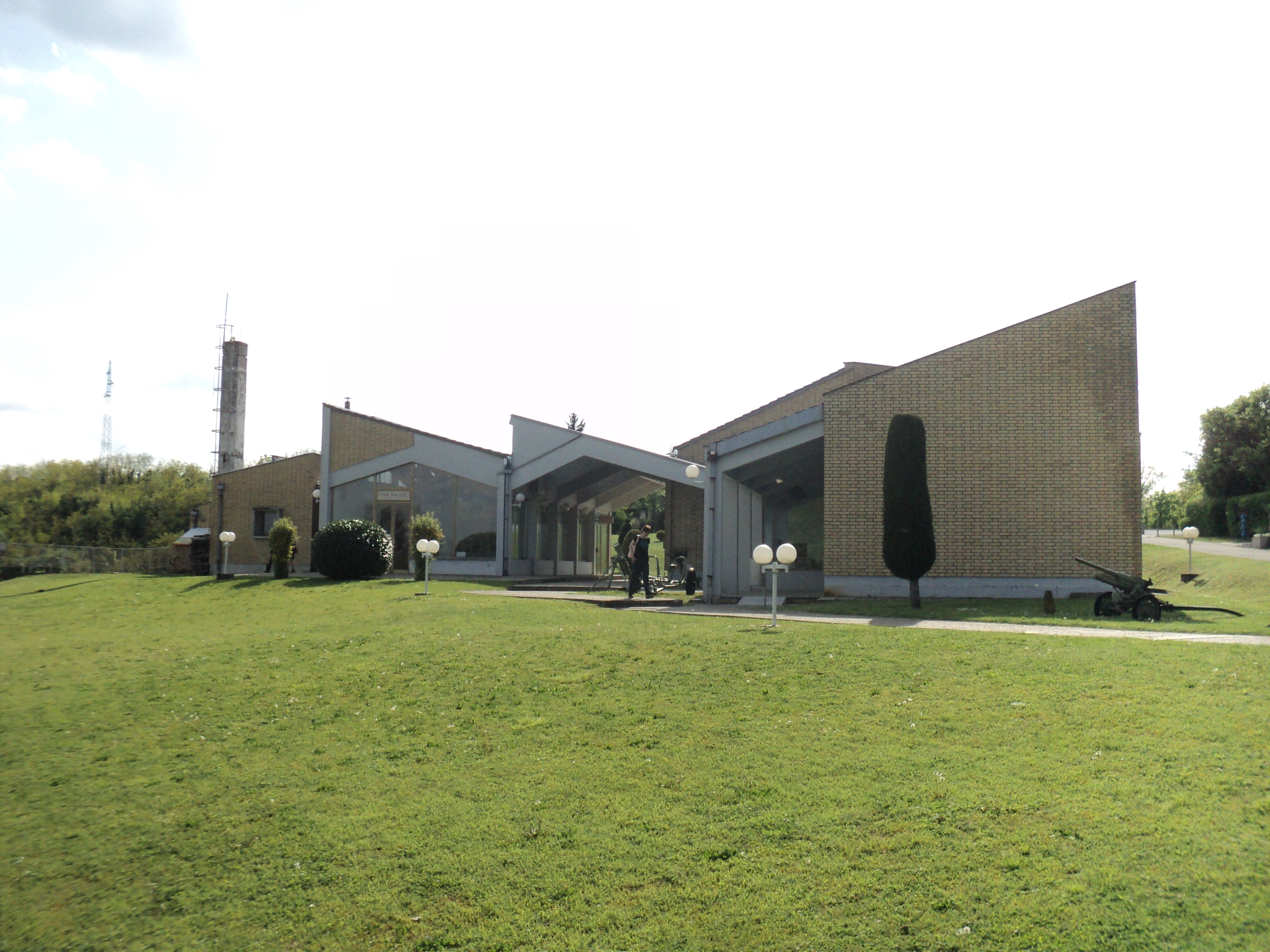
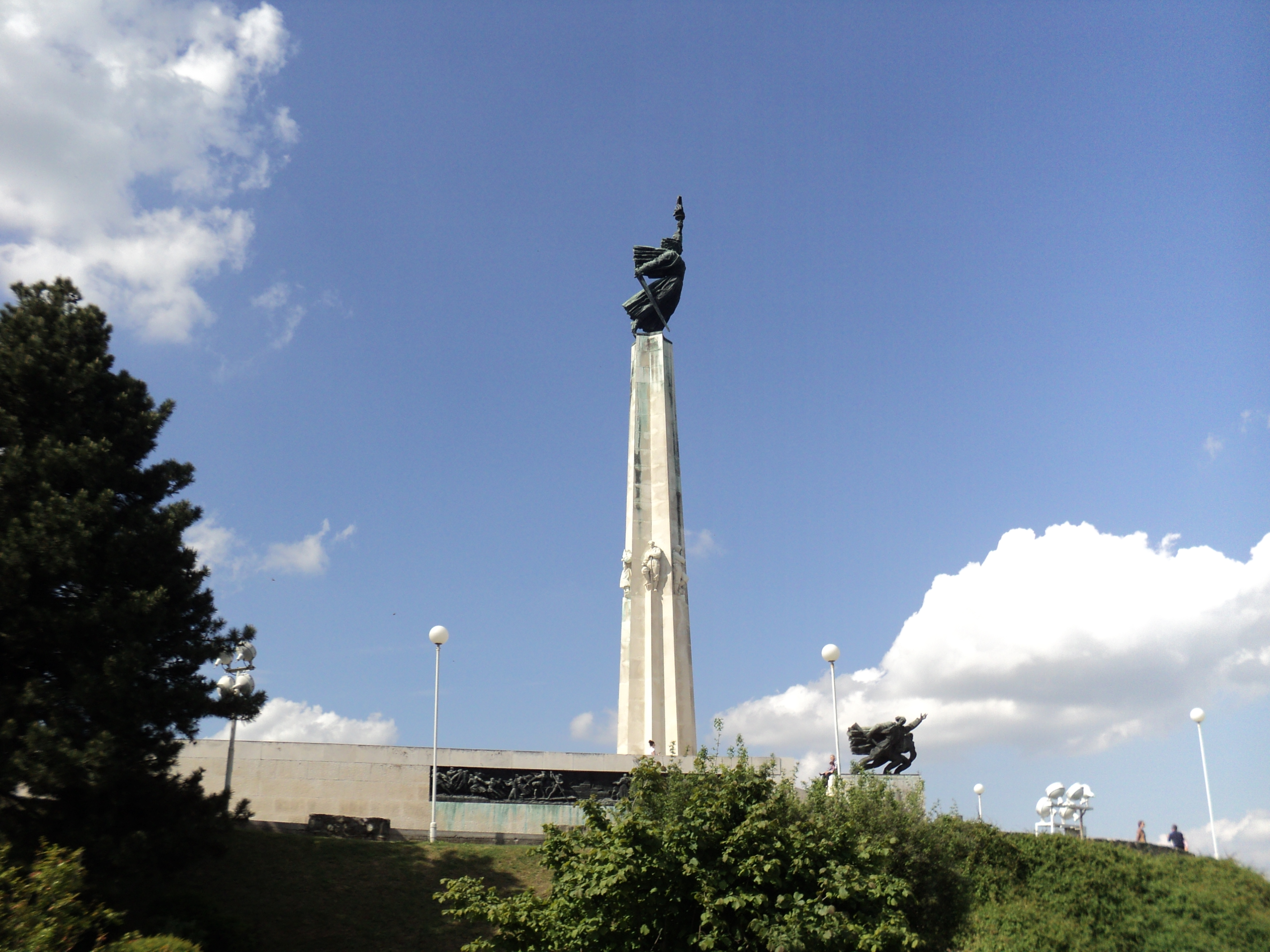
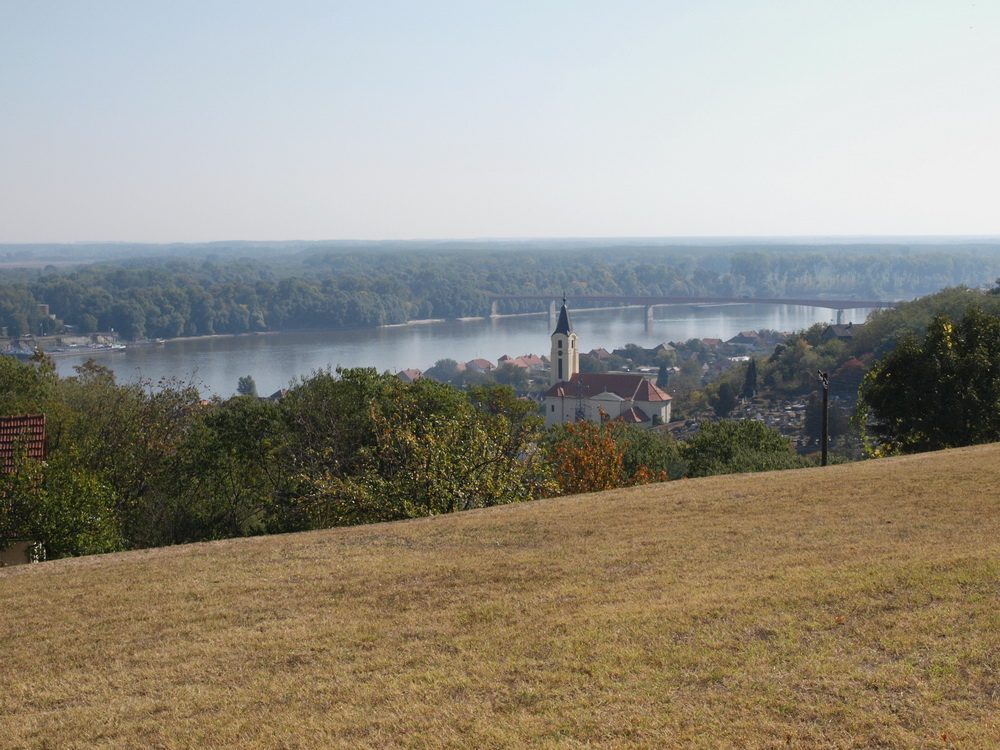
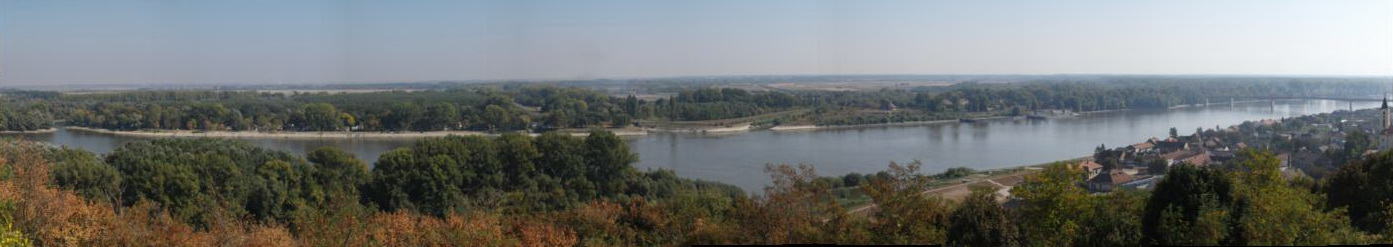
- Batina

- Location within Osijek-Baranja County Location within Croatia Location within Europe
- Coordinates: 45.846°N 18.850°E
- Country: Croatia
- Region: Baranya (Podunavlje)
- County: Osijek-Baranja County
- Municipality: Draž

Area
  - Total: 22.8 km^{2} (8.8 sq mi)

Population (2021)
  - Total: 594
  - Density: 26.1/km^{2} (67.5/sq mi)

Batina (Hungarian: Kiskőszeg, Serbian Cyrillic: Батина) is a port village on the right bank of the Danube (Croatian: Dunav) river in Baranja, Croatia. It developed into the local center of the northeastern part of Baranja, in the part of Bansko brdo hill where the slopes reach the Danube river.

== Geography ==
Batina is located on the D212 state road connecting the village to the city of Osijek. The most important connection between Baranja and Bačka leads through the village, where the bridge Most 51. divizije was built over the Danube river in 1974. Before the bridge was built, transport was done by ferry. The bridge is also a state border crossing.

Administratively, Batina is located in the Draž municipality within the Osijek-Baranja county.

Batina's elevation is 105 m.

== History ==
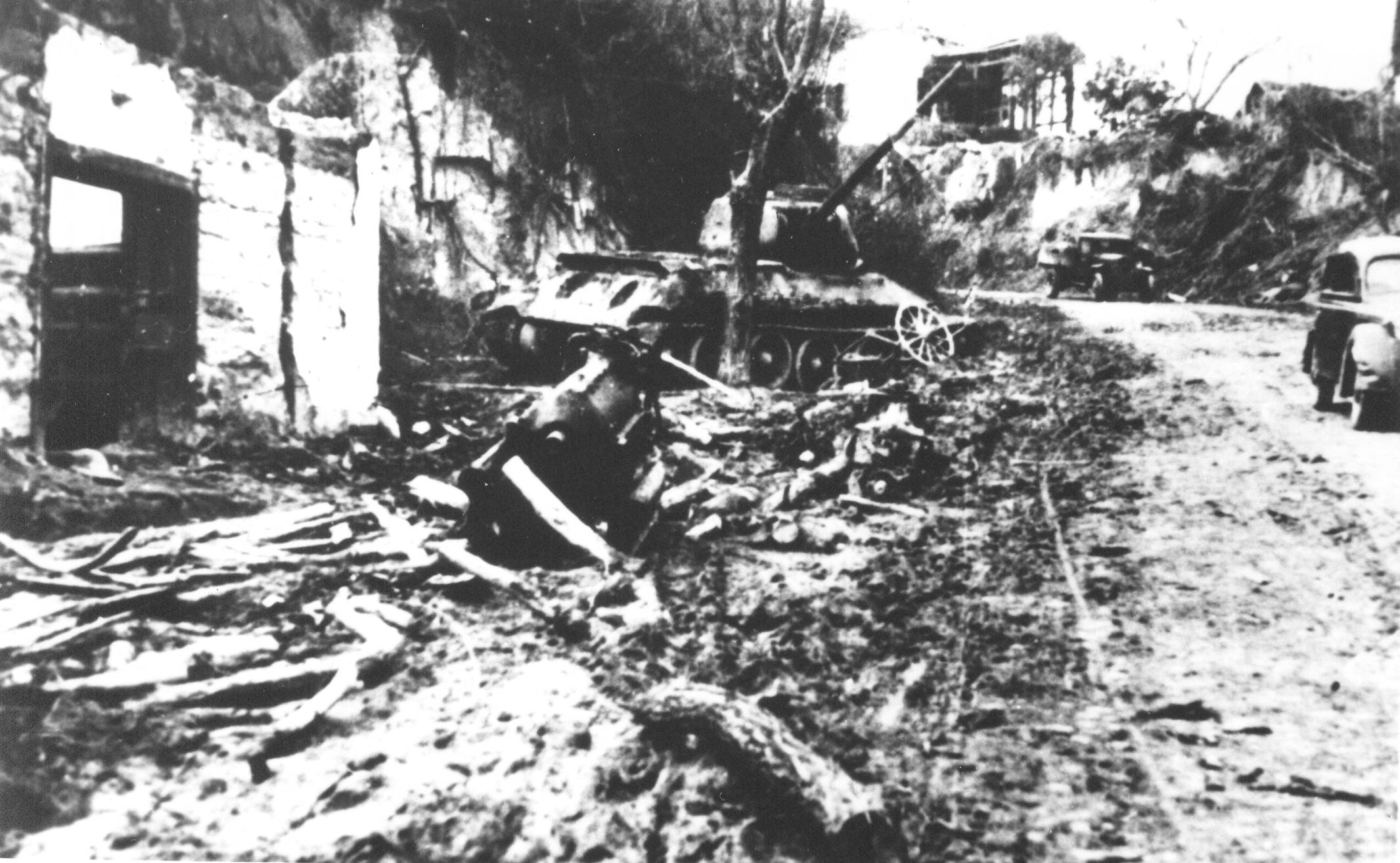
Batina after the battle

In the book Hrvatski baranjski mjestopisi by Ante Sekulić, it is claimed that the settlement of Batina was known in Roman times, and was also recorded in 1316. It was originally recorded as Kurszug, then Hungarian Kőszeg (kő stone, szeg edge).

Batina was officially founded in 1720 by the settlement of Croats, Serbs, Hungarians and Germans, while according to the book Tri stoljeća Belja, it was mentioned as a wasteland in the tax books as early as 1591: "It is assumed that it was also desolate during the liberation wars." In 1696, Serbian settlers probably settled there. In 1718, it was settled again by very poor South Slavs and Hungarians. In 1780, German settlers joined them. The area of Karapandža and the settlement of Kenđija belong to it.

The village is known as the site of World War II Battle of Batina which took place from 11 to 29 November 1944. It was a battle between the units of the Red Army and the People's Liberation Army against the Wehrmacht and their allies. Today, a memorial site commemorates the battle which was one of the bloodiest World War II battles on Yugoslav soil.

== See also ==
- Osijek-Baranja county
- Baranja
