= Slavonski Šamac =

- Municipality
- Općina Slavonski Šamac; Municipality of Slavonski Šamac
- Interactive map of Slavonski Šamac
- Location within Croatia
- Coordinates: 45°04′N 18°29′E
- Country: Croatia
- County: Brod-Posavina County

Government
  - Municipal mayor: Branislav Milinović (HDZ)

Area
  - Municipality: 22.5 km^{2} (8.7 sq mi)
  - Urban: 8.5 km^{2} (3.3 sq mi)

Population (2021)
  - Municipality: 1,576
  - Density: 70.0/km^{2} (181/sq mi)
  - Urban: 768
  - Urban density: 90/km^{2} (230/sq mi)
- Time zone: UTC+1 (CET)
  - Summer (DST): UTC+2 (CEST)
- Postal code: 35220 Slavonski Šamac
- Area code: 035
- Vehicle registration: SB
- Website: slavonski-samac.hr

Slavonski Šamac is a village and municipality located on the river Sava in Croatia. It is located in Brod-Posavina county in the region of Slavonia. On the opposite side of the river lies the Bosnian town of Šamac. Slavonski Šamac is located on the D7 road, a part of the European route E73.

== Demographics ==
In 2021, the municipality had 1,576 residents in the following settlements:

- Kruševica, population 808
- Slavonski Šamac, population 768
Slavonski Šamac: Population trends 1857–2021
v

population	1173	1156	1302	1452	1490	1483	1437	1511	1670	2673	2513	2777	2762	2665	2649	2169	1576
	1857	1869	1880	1890	1900	1910	1921	1931	1948	1953	1961	1971	1981	1991	2001	2011	2021

Sources: Croatian Bureau of Statistics publications
