= Kotlina, Baranja =

Kotlina Sepse (Hungarian)
- Village (Selo)
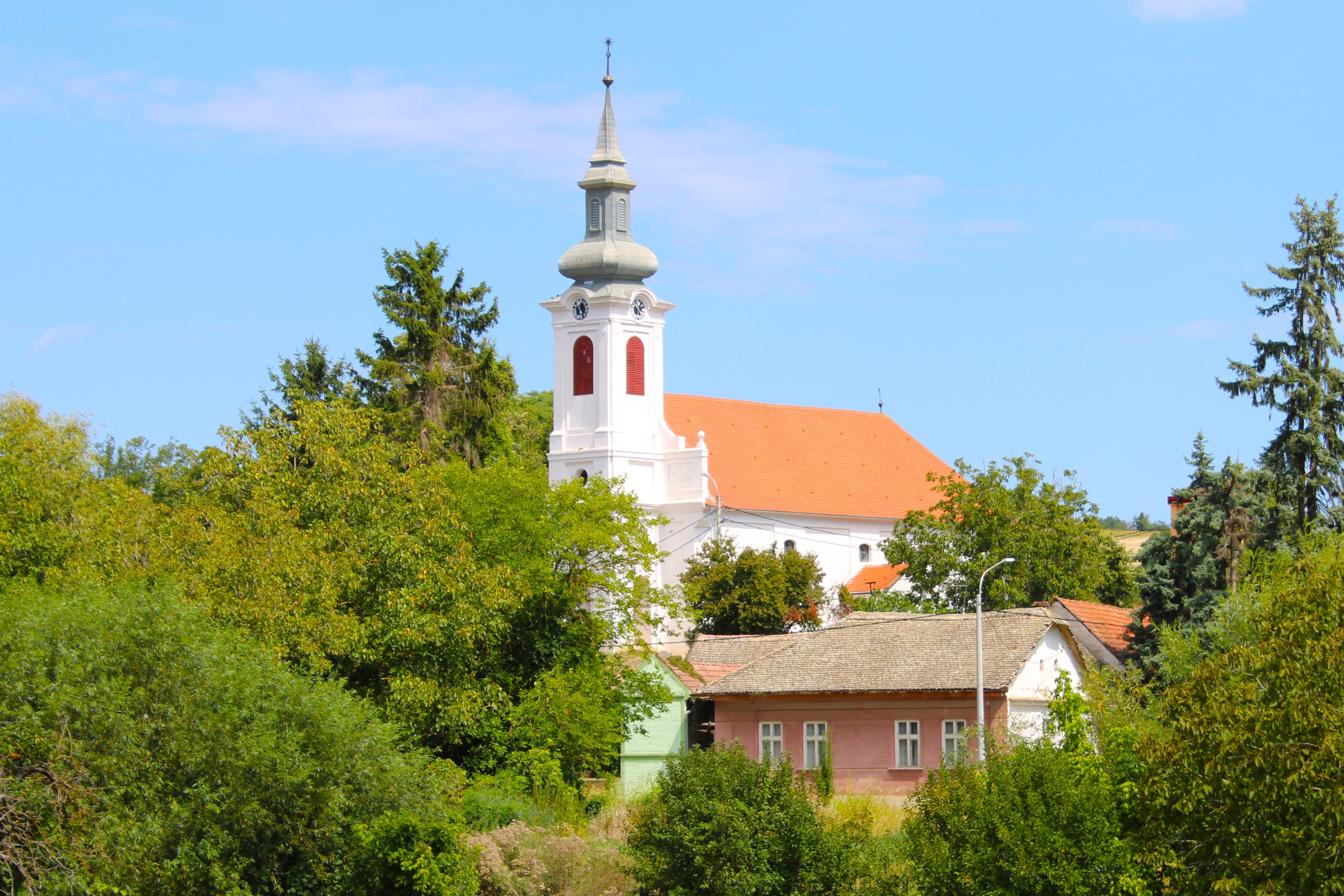
- Reformed Church, Kotlina

- Location of Kotlina in Croatia Kotlina (Croatia) Kotlina (Europe)
- Coordinates: 45.78333333°N 18.73333333°E
- Country: Croatia
- Region: Baranya (Podunavlje)
- County: Osijek-Baranja
- Municipality: Kneževi Vinogradi

Area
  - Total: 11.6 km^{2} (4.5 sq mi)

Population (2021)
  - Total: 203
  - Density: 17.5/km^{2} (45.3/sq mi)
- Time zone: UTC+1 (CET)
  - Summer (DST): UTC+2 (CEST)

Kotlina (Hungarian: Sepse; Serbian Cyrillic: Котлина) is a settlement in the region of Baranja, Croatia. Administratively, it is located in the Kneževi Vinogradi municipality within the Osijek-Baranja County. The population is 334 people.

== Ethnic groups (2001 census) ==
- Hungarians = 295
- Croats = 26
- Serbs = 3
- others = 10

== See also ==
- Reformed Church, Kotlina
- Osijek-Baranja county
- Baranja
