= Donji Svilaj =

Donji Svilaj Доњи Свилај
- Village
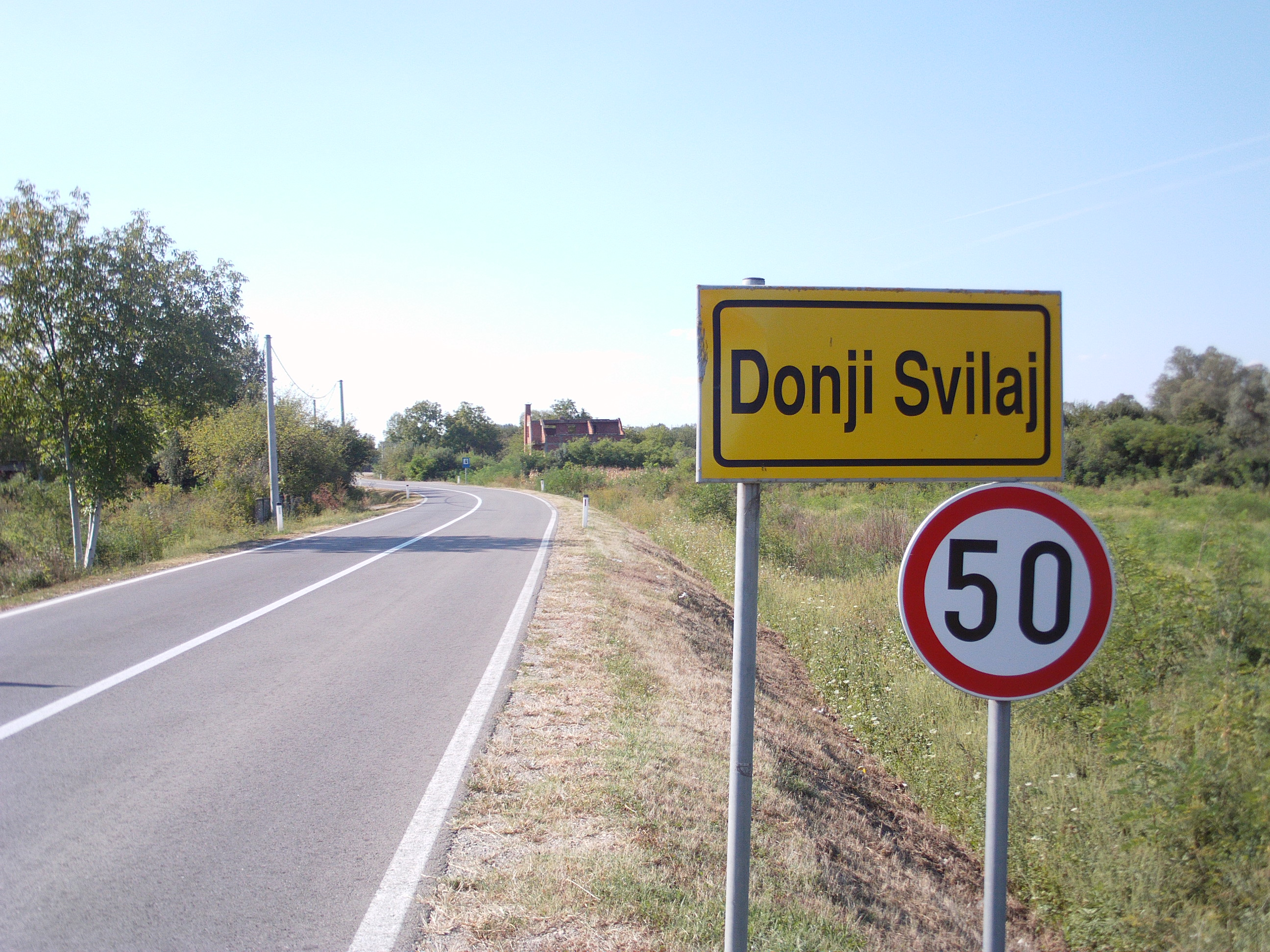
- Donji Svilaj village sign. On both sides of the road at the Donji Svilaj eastern boundary are ruins of Miletić family houses, all destroyed in Yugoslav war.
- Interactive map of Donji Svilaj
- Location within Bosnia and Herzegovina
- Coordinates: 45.108°N 18.272°E
- Country: Bosnia and Herzegovina
- Entity: Federation of Bosnia and Herzegovina
- Canton: Posavina
- Municipality: Odžak

Area
  - Total: 6.93 sq mi (17.95 km^{2})

Population (2013)
  - Total: 1,107
  - Density: 159.7/sq mi (61.67/km^{2})
- Time zone: UTC+1 (CET)
  - Summer (DST): UTC+2 (CEST)
- Postal code: 76297
- Area code: +387 31
- Website: www.svilaj.jimbo.com

Donji Svilaj (Serbian Cyrillic: Доњи Свилај) is a village in the Odžak municipality, Posavina Canton, Bosnia and Herzegovina.

== Demographics ==
According to the 1991 census, the settlement had 1576 inhabitants.

According to the 2013 census, its population was 1,107.

Population of Donji Svilaj municipality
Year of census	1991.	1981.	1971.
Croats	1.408 (89,34%)	1.389 (86,27%)	1.453 (90,02%)
Serbs	143 (9,07%)	153 (9,50%)	156 (9,66%)
Muslims	2 (0,12%)	2 (0,12%)	0
Yugoslavs	13 (0,82%)	8 (0,49%)	0
Others or unknown	10 (0,63%)	58 (3,60%)	5 (0,30%)
Total	1.576	1.610	1.614

== Sport ==
Donji Svilaj is the home of HNK Mladost.
