= Čepin =

- Municipality
- Općina Čepin; Municipality of Čepin
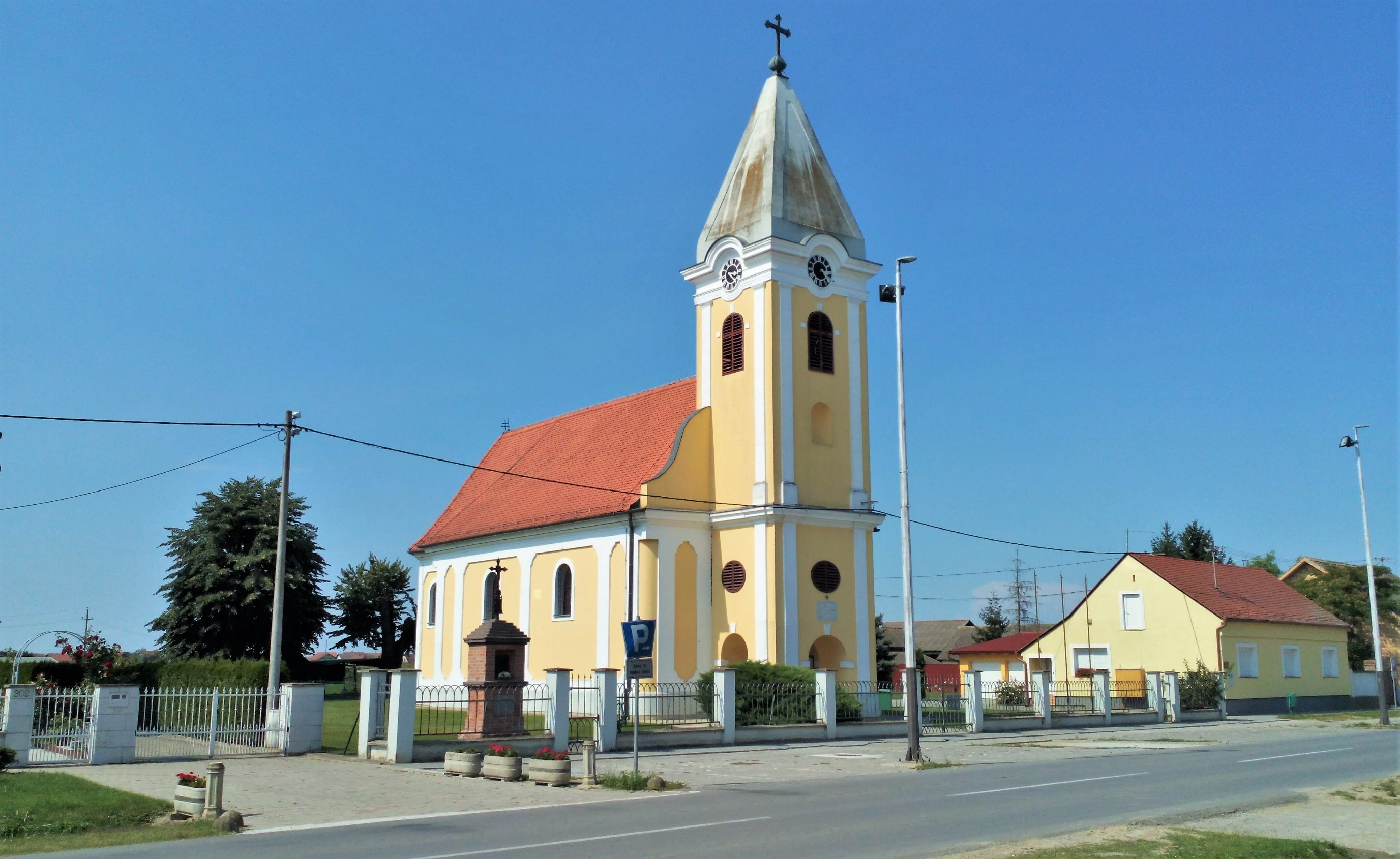
- Church of Holy Trinity

- Flag Coat of arms

- Location of Čepin in Croatia Čepin (Croatia) Čepin (Europe)
- Coordinates: 45°31′25″N 18°33′48″E
- Country: Croatia
- Region: Slavonia
- County: Osijek-Baranja County

Government
  - Municipal mayor: Dražen Tonkovac (HSS)

Area
  - Municipality: 120.7 km^{2} (46.6 sq mi)
  - Urban: 75.3 km^{2} (29.1 sq mi)

Population (2021)
  - Municipality: 14,831
  - Density: 122.9/km^{2} (318.2/sq mi)
  - Urban: 8,001
  - Urban density: 106/km^{2} (275/sq mi)
- Time zone: UTC+1 (CET)
  - Summer (DST): UTC+2 (CEST)
- Postal code: 31431 Čepin
- Area code: 031
- Vehicle registration: OS
- Website: cepin.hr

Čepin (Hungarian: Csepin; German: Tschepin; Serbian Cyrillic: Чепин) is a village and a municipality in Osijek-Baranja County, Croatia. It is located in northeast Slavonia, 10 kilometers southwest of Osijek.

Čepin, with its 14,830 inhabitants at the 2018 census, is now included in Osijek built-up area. The majority of the population is Croat at 93.8%. Minorities include Serbs and Hungarians.

There is also an airport, used exclusively for sport and private flying purposes (Sport AirPort and private fly)

== History ==
In the late 19th and early 20th century, Čepin was part of the Virovitica County of the Kingdom of Croatia-Slavonia.

== Demographics ==
According to the 2011 census, the Municipality of Čepin had 11,599 inhabitants, making it the third largest municipality in Croatia and largest in Slavonia by population. The village of Čepin itself, with 9,500 inhabitants, is the largest settlement in Croatia which doesn't have a town status (excluding Sesvete), hence sometimes being called the "biggest village in Croatia".

In 2011, the following villages comprised the Čepin municipality:

- Beketinci - 613
- Čepin - 9,500
- Čepinski Martinci - 663
- Čokadinci - 173
- Livana - 650

The village of Ovčara, which had a population of 1,066 in the 2001 census, was abolished and merged with the settlement of Čepin in 2005.

The villages of Čepinski Martinci, Čokadinci, and Livana were established as a colonist settlement during the land reform in interwar Yugoslavia.

== Politics ==
=== Minority councils ===
Directly elected minority councils and representatives are tasked with consulting tasks for the local or regional authorities in which they are advocating for minority rights and interests, integration into public life and participation in the management of local affairs. At the 2023 Croatian national minorities councils and representatives elections Serbs of Croatia fulfilled legal requirements to elect 10 members municipal minority councils of the Čepin Municipality but the elections were not held due to the lack of candidates.

== Notable people ==
- Svemir Đorđić

== Bibliography ==
- Poljak, Željko (February 1959). "Ostlali krajevi Slavonije". Kazalo za "Hrvatski planinar" i "Naše planine" 1898—1958 (PDF). Naše planine. Vol. XI. p. 7. ISSN 0354-0650.
