= Velika Kopanica =

- Municipality
- Interactive map of Velika Kopanica
- Location of Velika Kopanica in Croatia
- Coordinates: 45°09′N 18°24′E
- Country: Croatia
- County: Brod-Posavina County

Government
  - Mayor: Ivan Meteš (HDZ)

Area
  - Municipality: 74.3 km^{2} (28.7 sq mi)
  - Urban: 35.5 km^{2} (13.7 sq mi)

Population (2021)
  - Municipality: 2,621
  - Density: 35.3/km^{2} (91.4/sq mi)
  - Urban: 1,412
  - Urban density: 39.8/km^{2} (103/sq mi)
- Website: velikakopanica.hr

Velika Kopanica is a village and a municipality in Brod-Posavina County, Croatia.

== Demographics ==
In 2021, the municipality had 2,621 residents in the following settlements:

- Beravci, population 611
- Divoševci, population 262
- Kupina, population 206
- Mala Kopanica, population 130
- Velika Kopanica, population 1,412
Velika Kopanica: Population trends 1857–2021
v

population	2990	2923	2549	2954	3079	3377	3104	3356	3461	3770	4247	4080	3737	3557	3570	3308	2621
	1857	1869	1880	1890	1900	1910	1921	1931	1948	1953	1961	1971	1981	1991	2001	2011	2021

Sources: Croatian Bureau of Statistics publications

In 2011, 99% declared themselves Croats.

== Notable people ==
Velika Kopanica is the birthplace of the great 19th century Croatian educational pedagogist Ivan Filipović.
