= Branjin Vrh =

- Village (Selo)
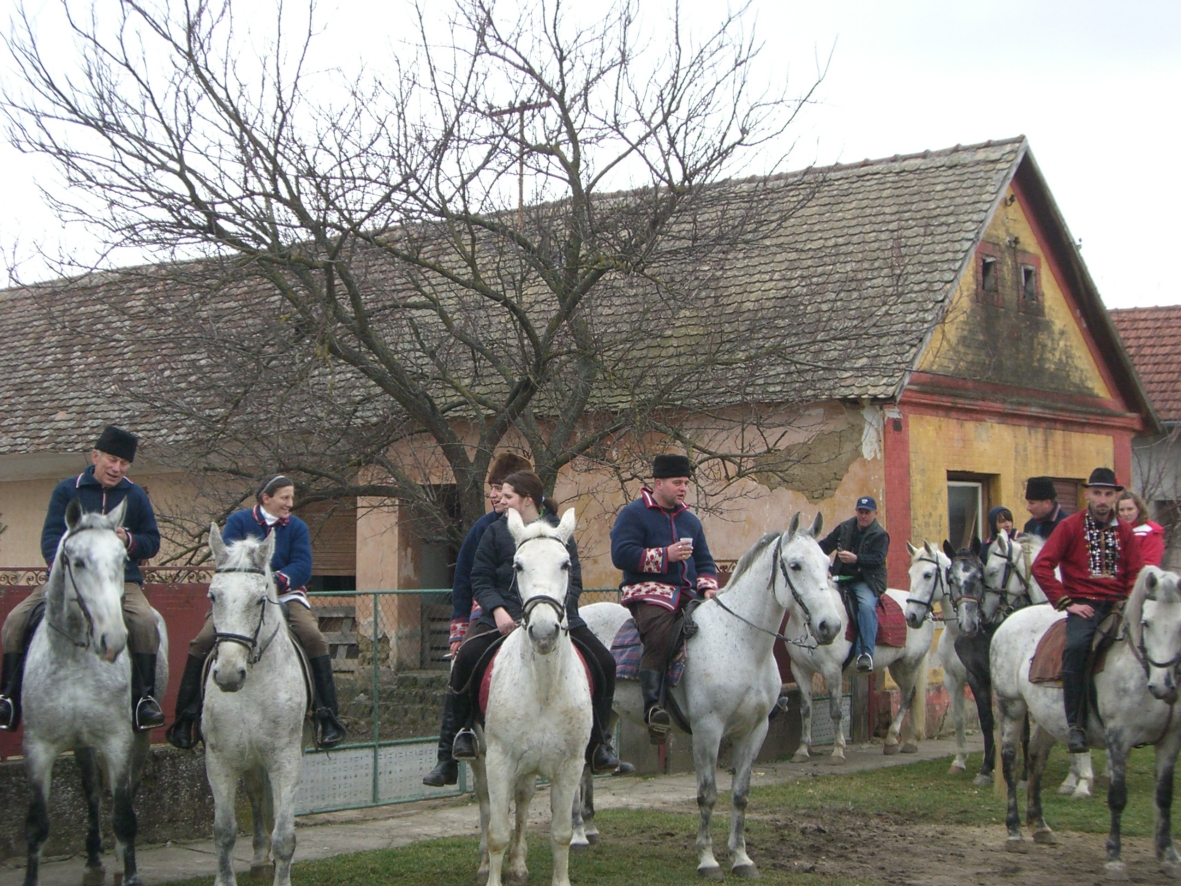
- Carnival riding in Branjin Vrh

- Location within Osijek-Baranja County Location within Croatia Location within Europe
- Country: Croatia
- County: Osijek-Baranja
- Municipality: Beli Manastir

Area
  - Total: 18.3 km^{2} (7.1 sq mi)

Population (2021)
  - Total: 764
  - Density: 41.7/km^{2} (108/sq mi)

Branjin Vrh (Hungarian: Baranyavár, Serbian Cyrillic: Брањин Врх) is a settlement in the region of Baranja, Croatia. Administratively, it is located in the Beli Manastir municipality within the Osijek-Baranja County.

== See also ==
- Osijek-Baranja County
- Baranja
