= Duboševica =

- Village (Selo)
- Location within Osijek-Baranja County Location within Croatia Location within Europe
- Country: Croatia
- County: Osijek-Baranja
- Municipality: Draž

Area
  - Total: 22.7 km^{2} (8.8 sq mi)

Population (2021)
  - Total: 393
  - Density: 17.3/km^{2} (44.8/sq mi)

Duboševica (Hungarian: Dályok, Serbian Cyrillic: Дубошевица) is a settlement in the region of Baranja, Croatia. Administratively, it is located in the Draž municipality within the Osijek-Baranja County. Population is 690 people.
