= D508 road =

State road in northwestern Croatia

D508 state road

Route information
- Length: 19.2 km (11.9 mi)

Major junctions
- From: D1 near Macelj border crossing
- To: D35 in Lepoglava

Location
- Country: Croatia
- Counties: Krapina-Zagorje
- Major cities: Đurmanec

Highway system
- Highways in Croatia

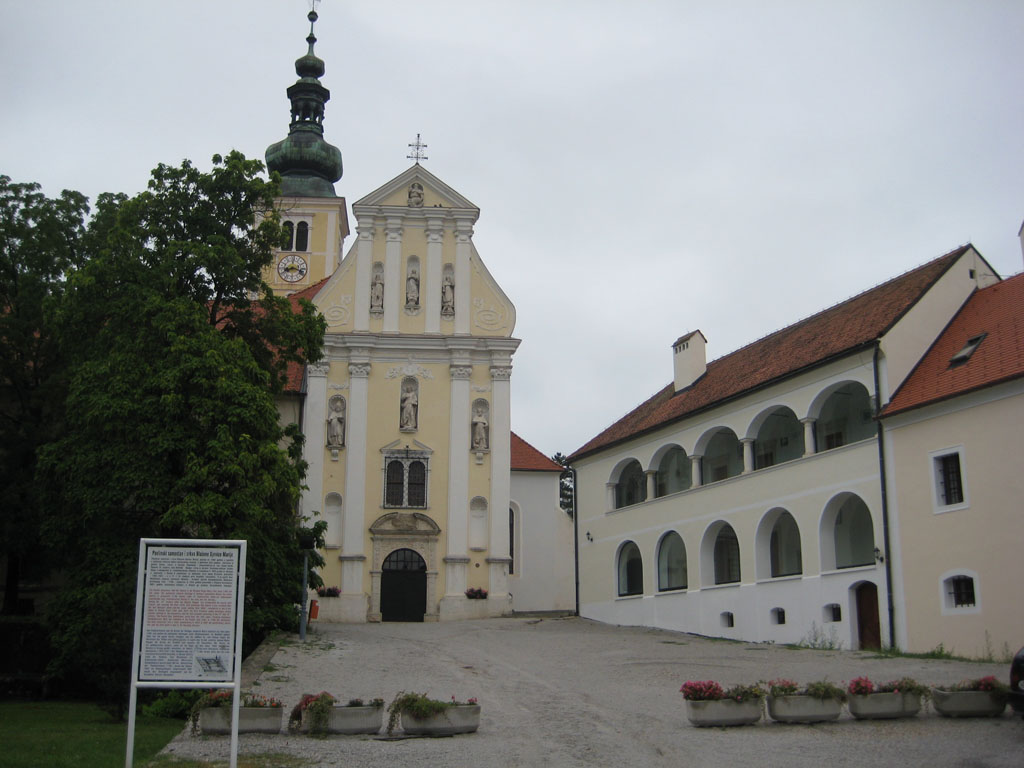
Lepoglava, at the southern terminus of the D508 road

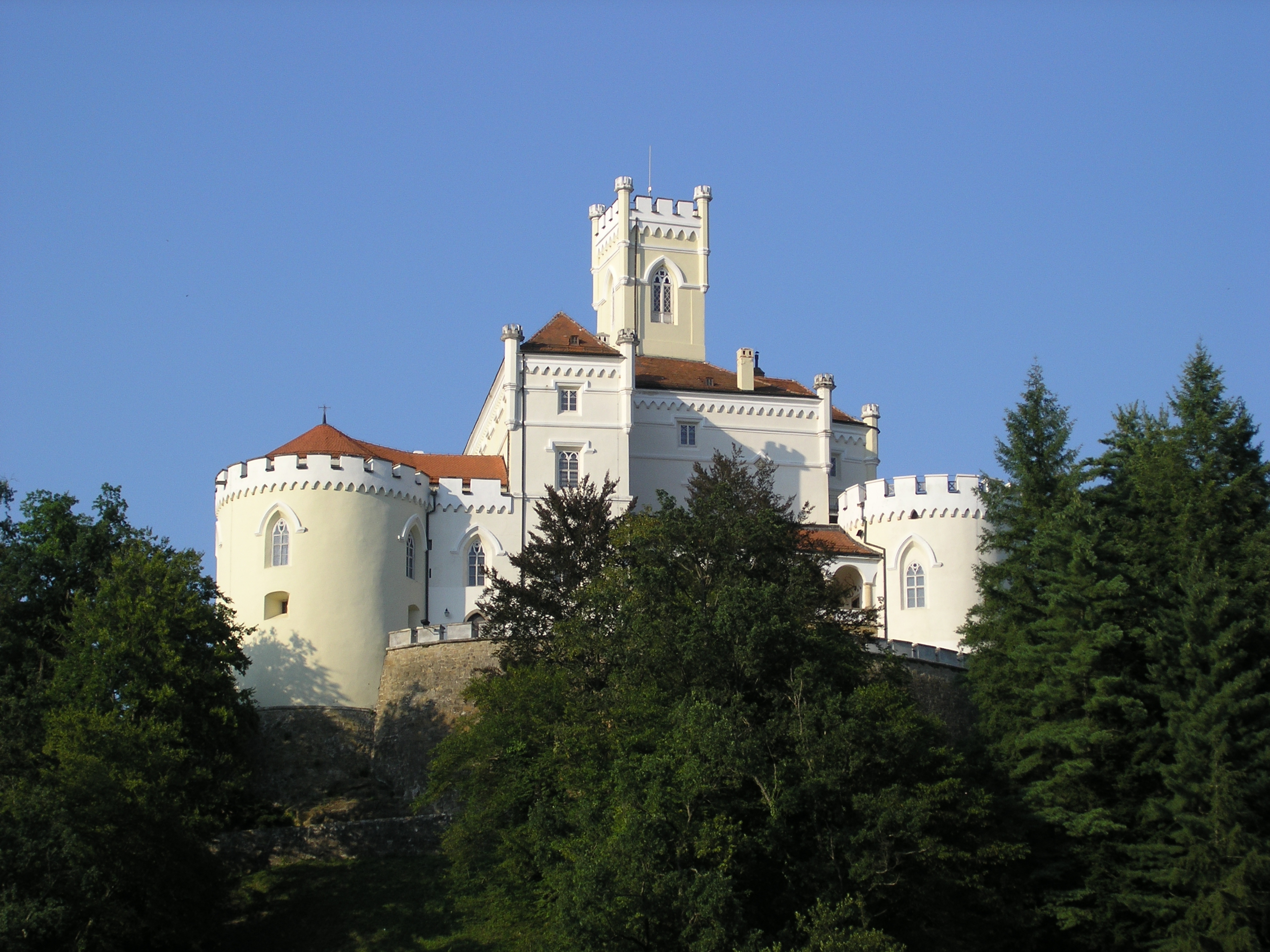
Trakošćan Castle, near the D508 road route

D508 is a state road in Hrvatsko Zagorje region of Croatia connecting Macelj border crossing to Slovenia and the A2 motorway Trakošćan interchange to the city of Lepoglava and to Trakošćan. The road is 19.2 km (11.9 mi) long.

The road and indeed all state roads in Croatia are managed and maintained by Hrvatske ceste, state owned company.

== Traffic volume ==
Traffic is regularly counted and reported by Hrvatske ceste, operator of the road.

D508 traffic volume
Road	Counting site	AADT	ASDT	Notes
D508	1102 Pleš (Bednja)	1,259	1,662	Adjacent to the Ž2099 junction.

== Road junctions and populated areas ==
D508 junctions/populated areas
Type	Slip roads/Notes
	D1 to Macelj border crossing and Krapina. The western terminus of the road.
	Trakošćan; Ž2056 to Jazbina Cvetlinska.
	Pleš
	Ž2083 to Vranojelje, Vrbno and Šaša.
	Bednja; Ž2099 to Gornje Jesenje.
	Rinkovec
	Muničevec
	Lepoglava; D35 to Varaždin (D2) (to the north) and to Sveti Križ Začretje (D1) (to the south). The eastern terminus of the road.

== See also ==
- State roads in Croatia
- Hrvatske ceste
