= Transport in Croatia =

Highway network in Croatia

Transport in Croatia relies on several main modes, including transport by car, train, ship and plane. Road transport incorporates a comprehensive network of state, county and local routes augmented by a network of highways for long-distance travelling. Water transport can be divided into sea, based on the ports of Rijeka, Ploče, Split and Zadar, and river transport, based on Sava, Danube and, to a lesser extent, Drava. Croatia has 9 international airports and several airlines, of which the most notable are Croatia Airlines and Trade Air. Rail network is fairly developed but regarding inter-city transport, bus tends to be far more common than the rail.

== Rail transport ==
=== Railway corridors ===
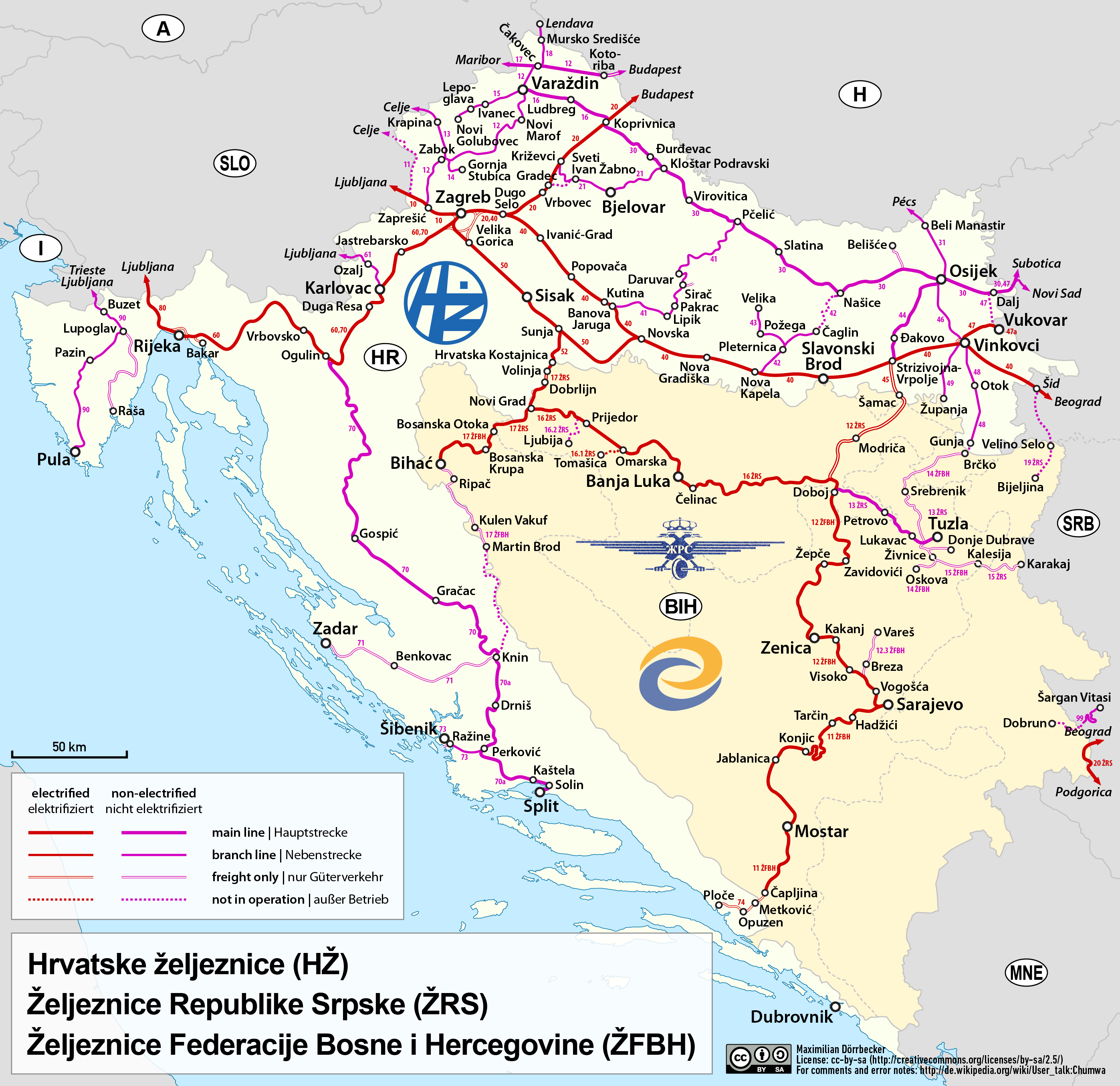
Railway network in Croatia and Bosnia and Herzegovina

The Croatian railway network is classified into three groups: railways of international, regional and local significance. The most important railway lines follow Pan-European corridors V/branch B (Rijeka - Zagreb - Budapest) and X, which connect with each other in Zagreb. With international passenger trains, Croatia is directly connected with two of the neighbouring (Slovenia and Hungary), and many medium-distanced Central European countries such as Czech Republic, Slovakia (during the summer season), Austria, Germany and Switzerland. Dubrovnik and Zadar are two of the most populous and well known cities in Croatia that are not connected with the railway, while the city of Pula (together with the rest of westernmost Istria County) can only be directly reached by railway through Slovenia (unless one takes the railway company's organized bus service between Rijeka and Lupoglav). As most of the country's interior-based larger towns are connected with the railway on which regular passenger train operation is provided (opposite to the coastal part of the country), there are many small inland towns, villages and remote areas that are served by the trains running on regional or local corridors.

=== Infrastructure condition ===
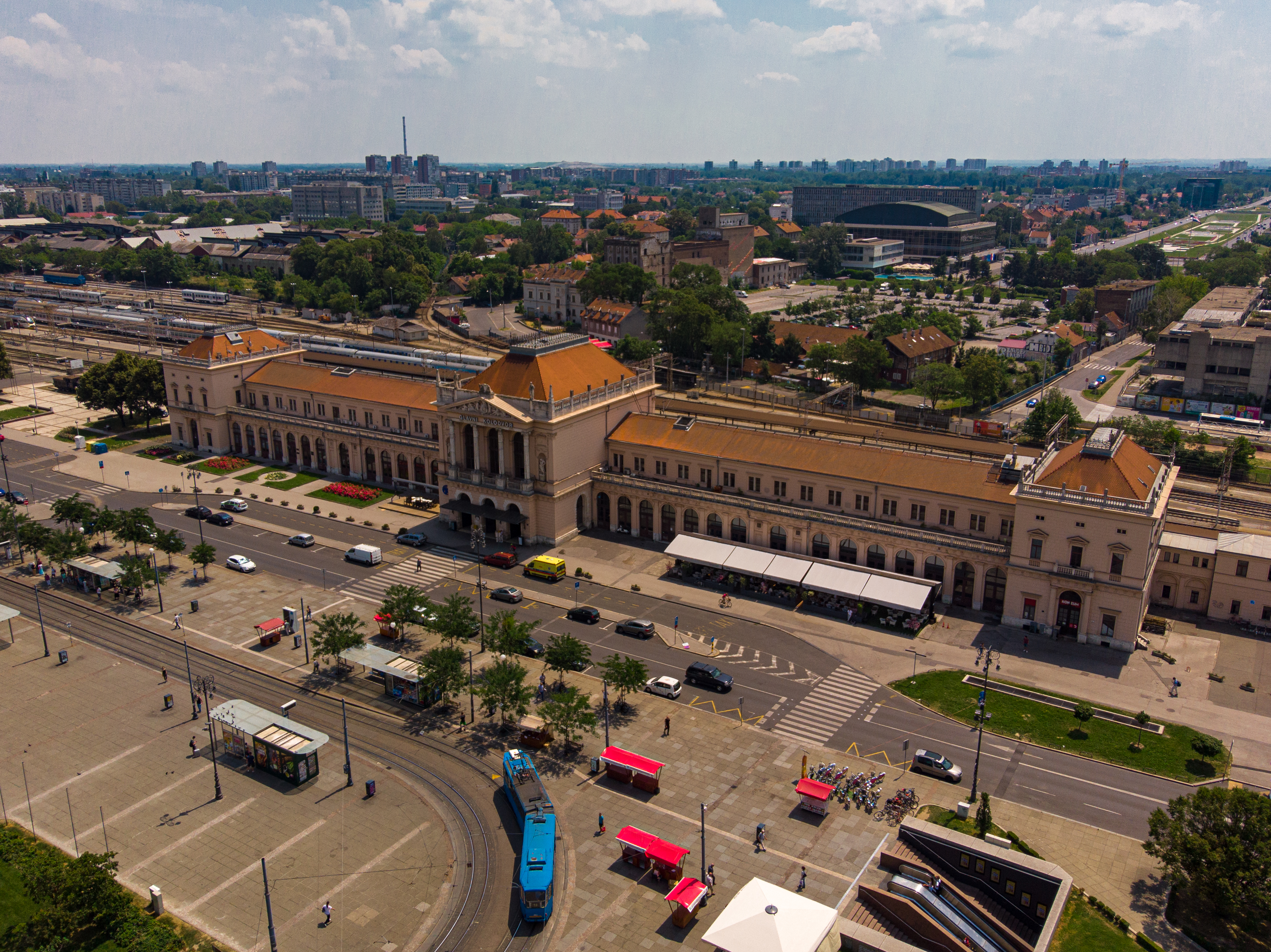
Zagreb Glavni kolodvor

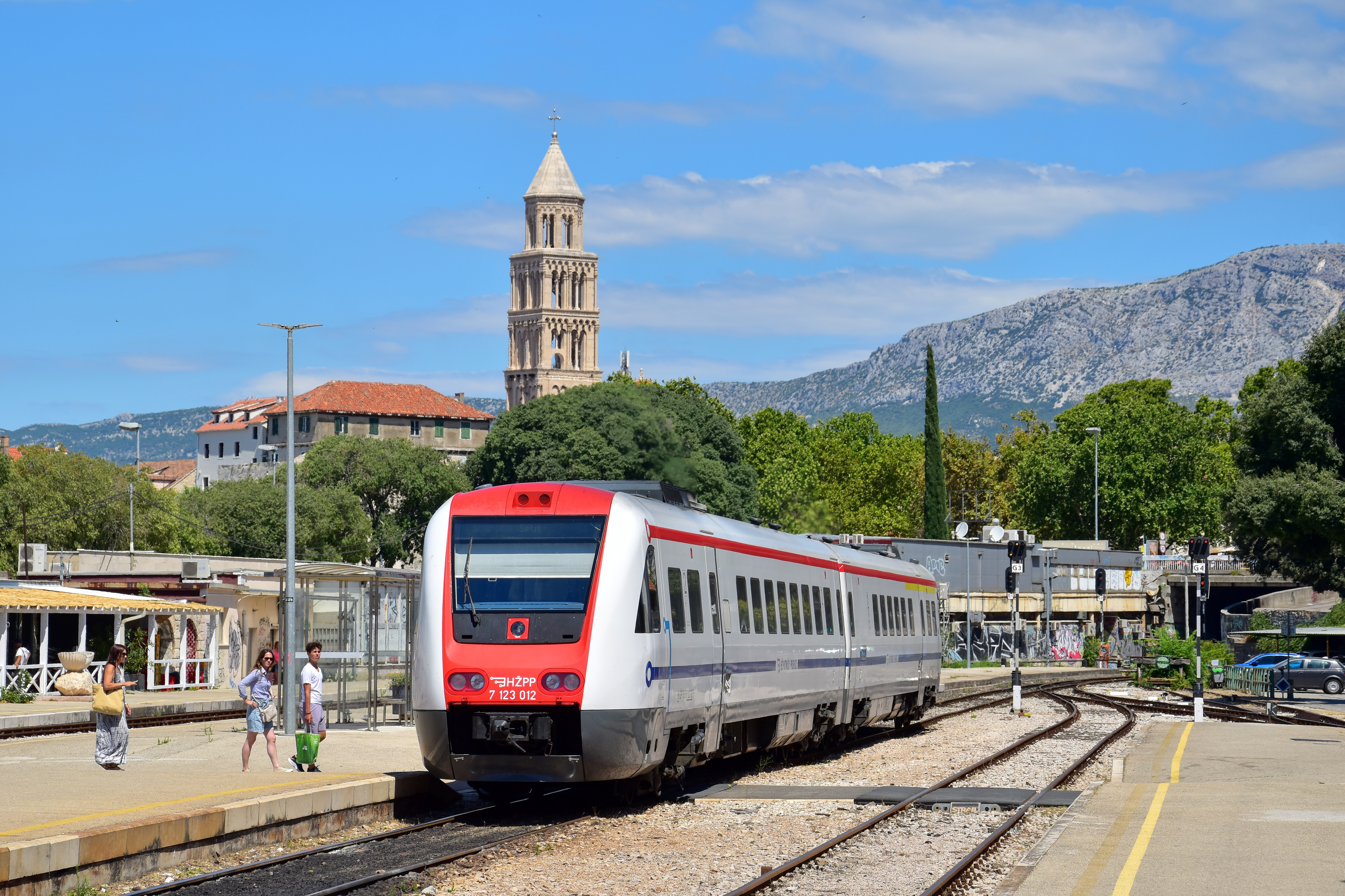
Split Suburban Railway

In Croatia, railways are served by standard-gauge (1,435 mm; 4 ft 8+^{1}/_{2}). Construction length of the railway network is 2617 km; 1626.12 mi. (2341 km / 1454.63 mi. of single-track corridors and 276 km / 171.49 mi. of double-track corridors). 1013 km (629.44 mi.) of railways are electrified, according to the annual rail network public report of Croatian Railways (2023 issue). The largest part of country's railway infrastructure dates back from the pre-World War II period and more than half of the core routes were, in fact, built during the Habsburg monarchy i.e. before World War I. More on that, there were also significant lack of investments and decrease of proper maintenance in Croatian railway infrastructure, roughly from the time of the country's independence (1991) to late 2000s, which mainly resulted in slowing of permitted track speeds, increase of the riding times and decrease in the overall quality of passenger transport, especially since 2010s on Inter City level. As a result, a fair number of routes lag significantly behind West-European standards in the form of infrastructural condition.

However, major infrastructure improvements started to occur in early 2010's and continued through 2020's, such as full-profile reconstruction and/or upgrading of the country's international and most of the regional/local corridors. Those improvements, among other things, results in increasing of both maximum track speed and operation safety, shortening of the travel time and modernization of supporting infrastructure (stations, platforms and other equipment).

First newly built railway in Croatia since 1967 (L214) was opened in December 2019.

The official rail speed record in Croatia is 181 km/h (112 mph). Maximum speed reached in regular service is 160 km/h (99 mph).

=== Passenger transport ===
All nationwide and commuter passenger rail services in Croatia are operated by the country's national railway company Croatian Railways.

== Air transport ==
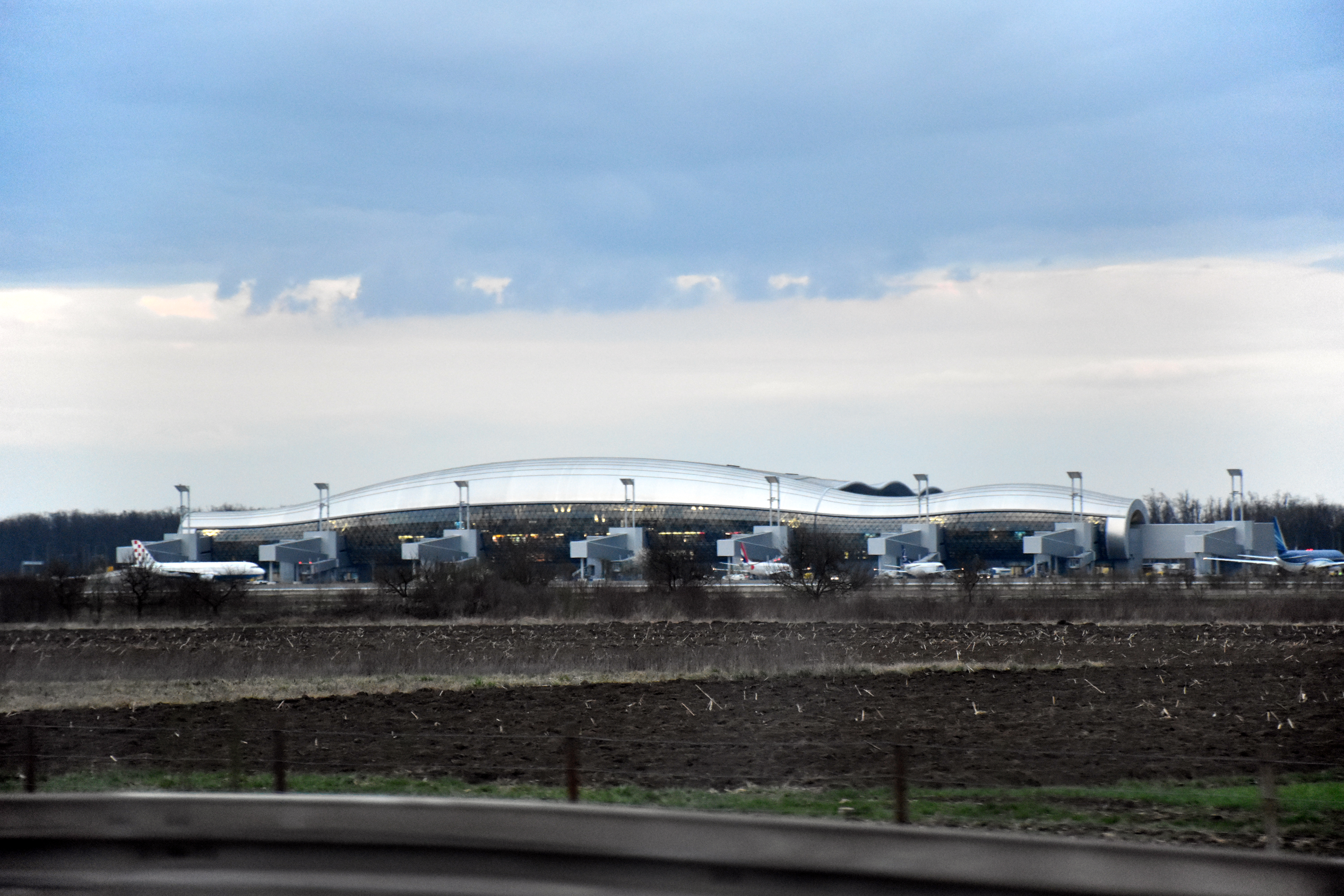
Zagreb Airport

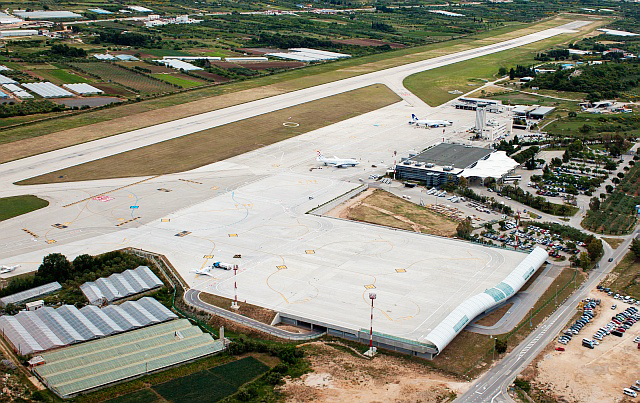
Split Airport

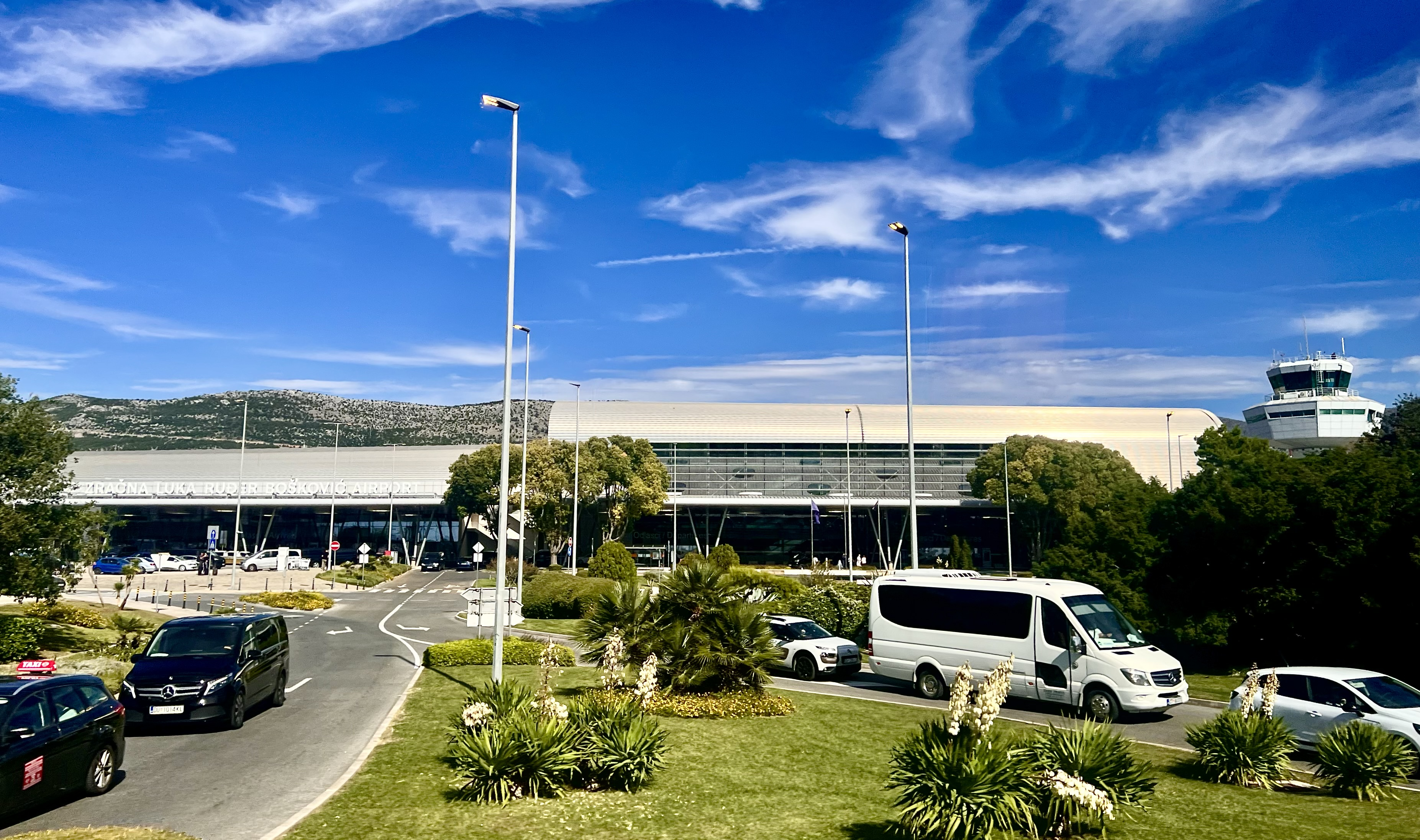
Dubrovnik Airport

Croatia counts 9 civil, 13 sport and 3 military airports. There are nine international civil airports: Zagreb Airport, Split Airport, Dubrovnik Airport, Zadar Airport, Pula Airport, Rijeka Airport (on the island of Krk), Osijek Airport, Bol and Mali Lošinj. The two busiest airports in the country are the ones serving Zagreb and Split.

By the end of 2010, significant investments in the renovation of Croatian airports began. New modern and spacious passenger terminals were opened in 2017 at Zagreb and Dubrovnik Airports and in 2019 at Split Airport. The new passenger terminals at Dubrovnik Airport and Zagreb Airport are the first in Croatia to feature jet bridges.

Airports that serve cities on the Adriatic coast receive the majority of the traffic during the summer season due to the large number of flights from foreign air carriers (especially low-cost) that serve these airports with seasonal flights.

Croatia Airlines is the state-owned flag carrier of Croatia. It is headquartered in Zagreb and its main hub is Zagreb Airport.

Croatia is connected by air with a large number of foreign (especially European) destinations, while its largest cities are interconnected by a significant number of domestic air routes such as lines between Zagreb and Split, Dubrovnik and Zadar, between Osijek and Rijeka, between Osijek and Split and between Zadar and Pula. This routes are operated by domestic air carriers such as Croatia Airlines or Trade Air.

== Road transport ==
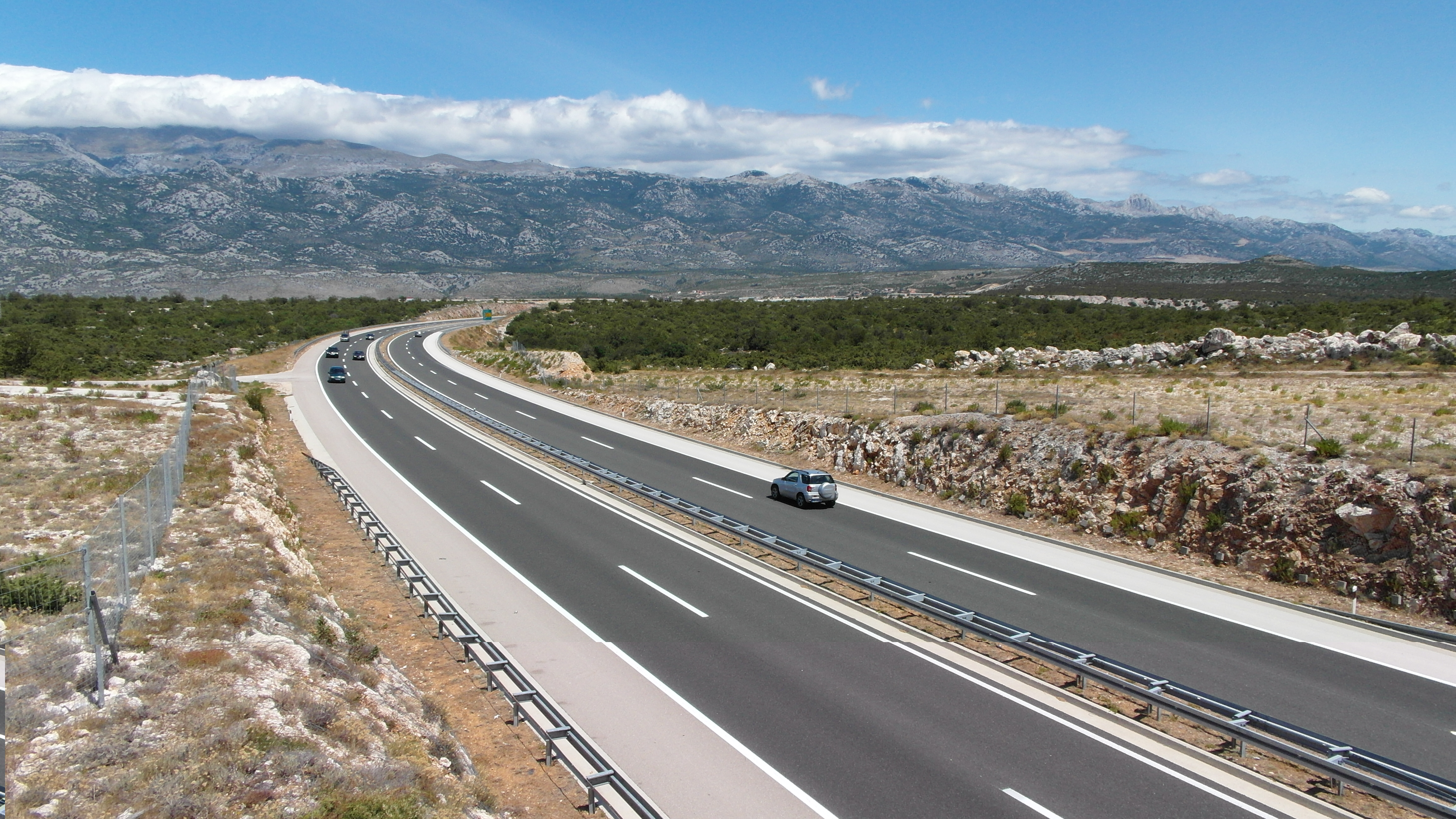
A1 motorway near Maslenica

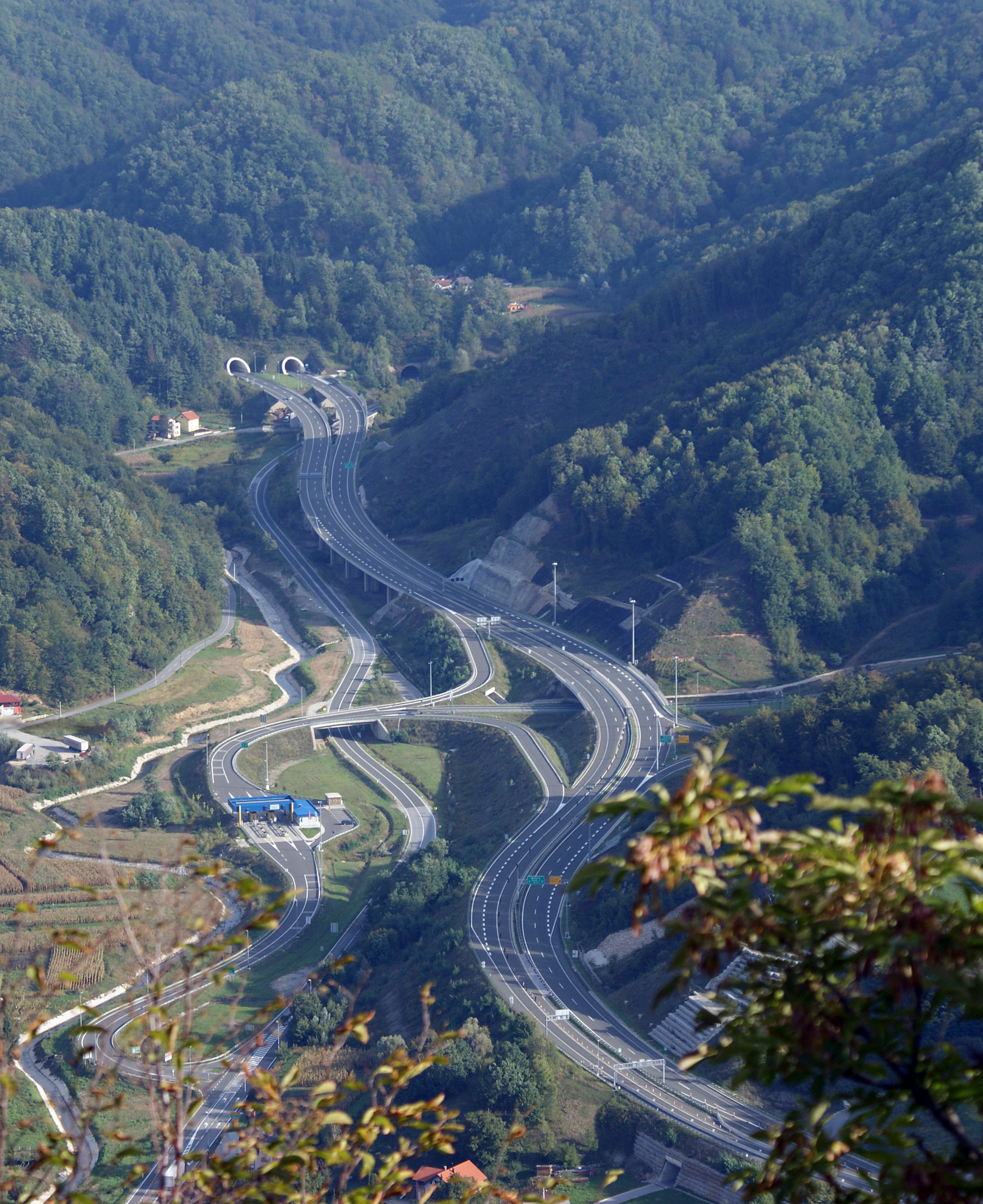
A2 motorway at Đurmanec

From the time of Napoleon and building the Louisiana road, the road transport in Croatia has significantly improved, topping most European countries. Croatian highways are widely regarded as being one of the most modern and safe in Europe. This is because the largest part of the Croatian motorway and expressway system (autoceste and brze ceste, resp.) has been recently constructed (mainly in the 2000s), and further construction is continuing. The motorways in Croatia connect most major Croatian cities and all major seaports. The two longest routes, the A1 and the A3, span the better part of the country and the motorway network connects most major border crossings.

Tourism is of major importance for the Croatian economy, and as most tourists come to vacation in Croatia in their own cars, the highways serve to alleviate summer jams. They have also been used as a means of stimulating urgently needed economic growth, and for the sustainable development of this country. Croatia now has a considerable highway density for a country of its size, helping it cope with the consequences of being a transition economy and having suffered in the Croatian War of Independence.

Some of the most impressive parts of the road infrastructure in Croatia includes the Sveti Rok and Mala Kapela tunnels on the A1 motorway, and the Pelješac Bridge in the southernmost part of the country.

As of 2015, Croatia has a total of 26,958 kilometers (16,751 mi) of roads.

=== Traffic laws ===
The traffic signs adhere to the Vienna Convention on Road Signs and Signals.

The general speed limits are:

- in inhabited areas 50 km/h
- outside of inhabited areas 90 km/h
- on marked expressways 110 km/h
- on marked motorways 130 km/h

Some of the more technical safety measures include that all new Croatian tunnels have modern safety equipment and there are several control cereers, which monitor highway traffic.

=== Motorways ===
Motorways (Croatian: Autocesta, plural Croatian: autoceste) in Croatia applies to dual carriageway roads with at least two traffic lanes in each driving direction and an emergency lane. Direction road signs at Croatian motorways have green background with white lettering similar to the German Autobahn. The designations of motorways are "A" and the motorway number. As of 2022, the Croatian motorway network is 1,306.53 kilometres (811.84 mi) long, with additional 25.3 kilometres (15.7 mi) of new motorways under construction. The list of completed motorways is as follows (see individual articles for further construction plans and status):

- A1, Zagreb - Bosiljevo - Split - Ploče (E71, E65)
- A2, Zagreb - Krapina - Macelj (E59)
- A3, Bregana - Zagreb - Lipovac (E70)
- A4, Goričan - Varaždin/Čakovec - Zagreb (E71)
- A5, Osijek - Đakovo - Sredanci (E73)
- A6, Bosiljevo - Rijeka (E65)
- A7, Rupa - Rijeka bypass (E61)
- A8, Kanfanar interchange - Matulji (E751)
- A9, Umag - Pula (E751)
- A10, A1 Ploče interchange - Metković border crossing
- A11, Velika Gorica - Lekenik

Toll is charged on most Croatian motorways, and exceptions are the A11 motorway, Zagreb bypass and Rijeka bypass, as well as sections adjacent to border crossings (except eastbound A3). Payment at toll gates is by all major credit cards or cash, in Euro. Most motorways are covered by the closed toll collection system, where a driver receives a ticket at the entrance gates and pays at the exit gates according to the number of sections travelled. Open toll collection is used on some bridges and tunnels and short stretches of tolled highway, where drivers immediately pay the toll upon arriving. Various forms of prepaid electronic toll collection systems are in place which allow quicker collection of toll, usually at a discounted rate, as well as use of dedicated toll plaza lanes (for ENC system of the electronic toll collection).

=== Expressways ===
The term brza cesta or expressway refers to limited-access roads specifically designated as such by legislation and marked with appropriate limited-access road traffic signs. The expressways may comprise two or more traffic lanes, while they normally do not have emergency lanes.

Polu-autocesta or semi-highway refers to a two-lane, undivided road running on one roadway of a motorway while the other is in construction. By legal definition, all semi-highways are expressways.

The expressway routes in Croatia usually correspond to a state road (see below) and are marked a "D" followed by a number. The "E" numbers are designations of European routes.

=== State roads ===
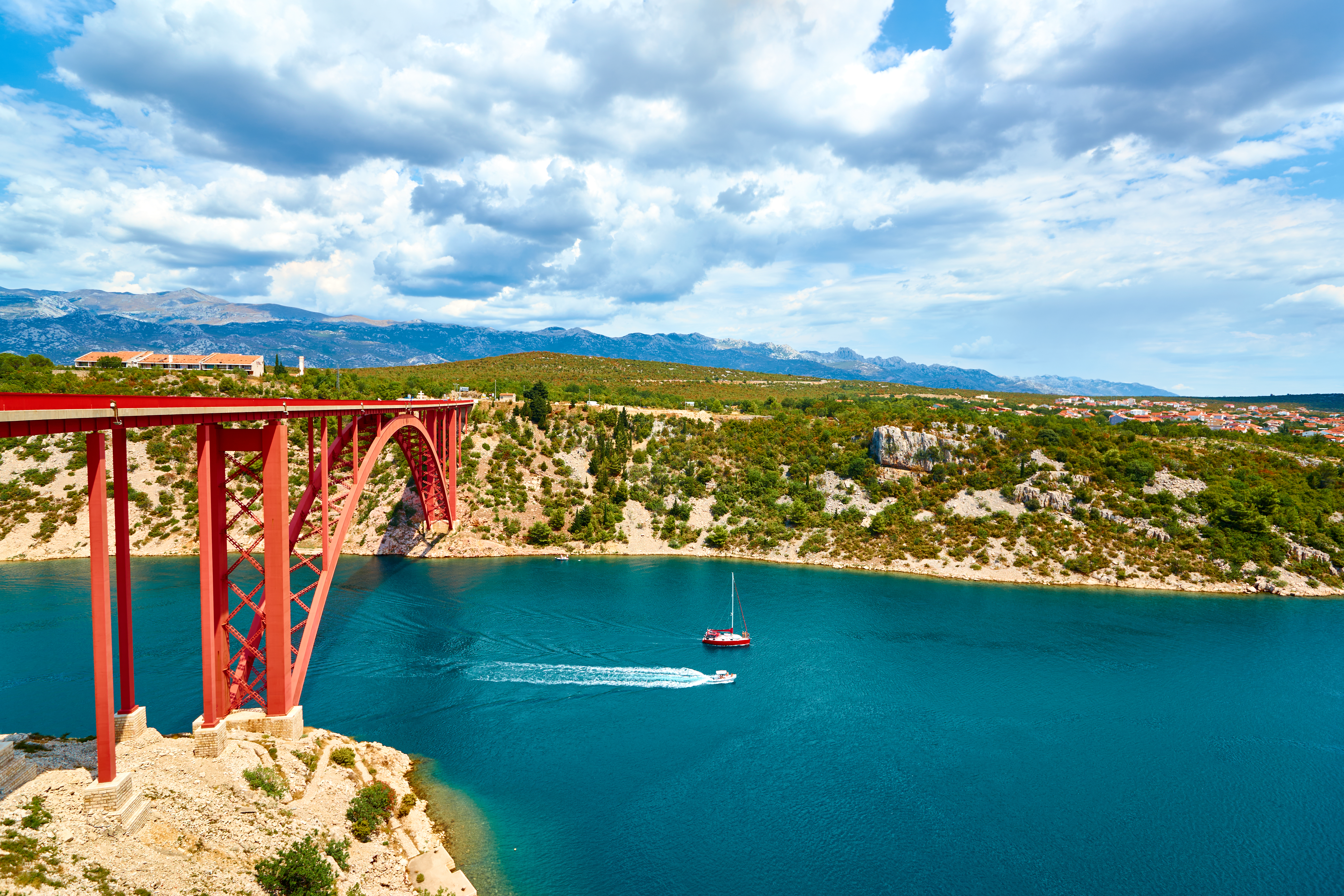
D8 road on Maslenica Bridge, Zadar County

Major roads that aren't part of the motorway system are državne ceste (state routes). They are marked with the letter D and the road's number.

The most traveled state routes in Croatia are:

- D1, connects Zagreb and Split via Lika - passes through Karlovac, Slunj, Plitvice, Korenica, Knin, Sinj.
- D2, connects Varaždin and Osijek via Podravina - passes through Koprivnica, Virovitica, Slatina, Našice.
- D8, connects Rijeka and Dubrovnik, widely known as Jadranska magistrala and part of E65 - runs along the coastline and connects many cities on the coast, including Crikvenica, Senj, Zadar, Šibenik, Trogir, Split, Omiš, Makarska and Ploče.

Since the construction of A1 motorway beyond Gorski kotar started, D1 and D8 are much less used.

These routes are monitored by Croatian roadside assistance because they connect important locations. Like all state routes outside major cities, they are only two-lane arterials and do not support heavy traffic. All state routes are routinely maintained by Croatian road authorities. The road sign for a state route has a blue background and the route's designation in white. State routes have one, two or three-digit numbers.

=== County roads and minor roads ===
Secondary routes are known as county roads. They are marked with signs with yellow background and road number. These roads' designations are rarely used, but usually marked on regional maps if these roads are shown. Formally, their designation is the letter Ž and the number. County roads have four-digit numbers.

The least known are the so-called local roads. Their designations are never marked on maps or by roadside signs and as such are virtually unknown to public. Their designations consist of the letter L and a five-digit number.

=== Bus traffic ===
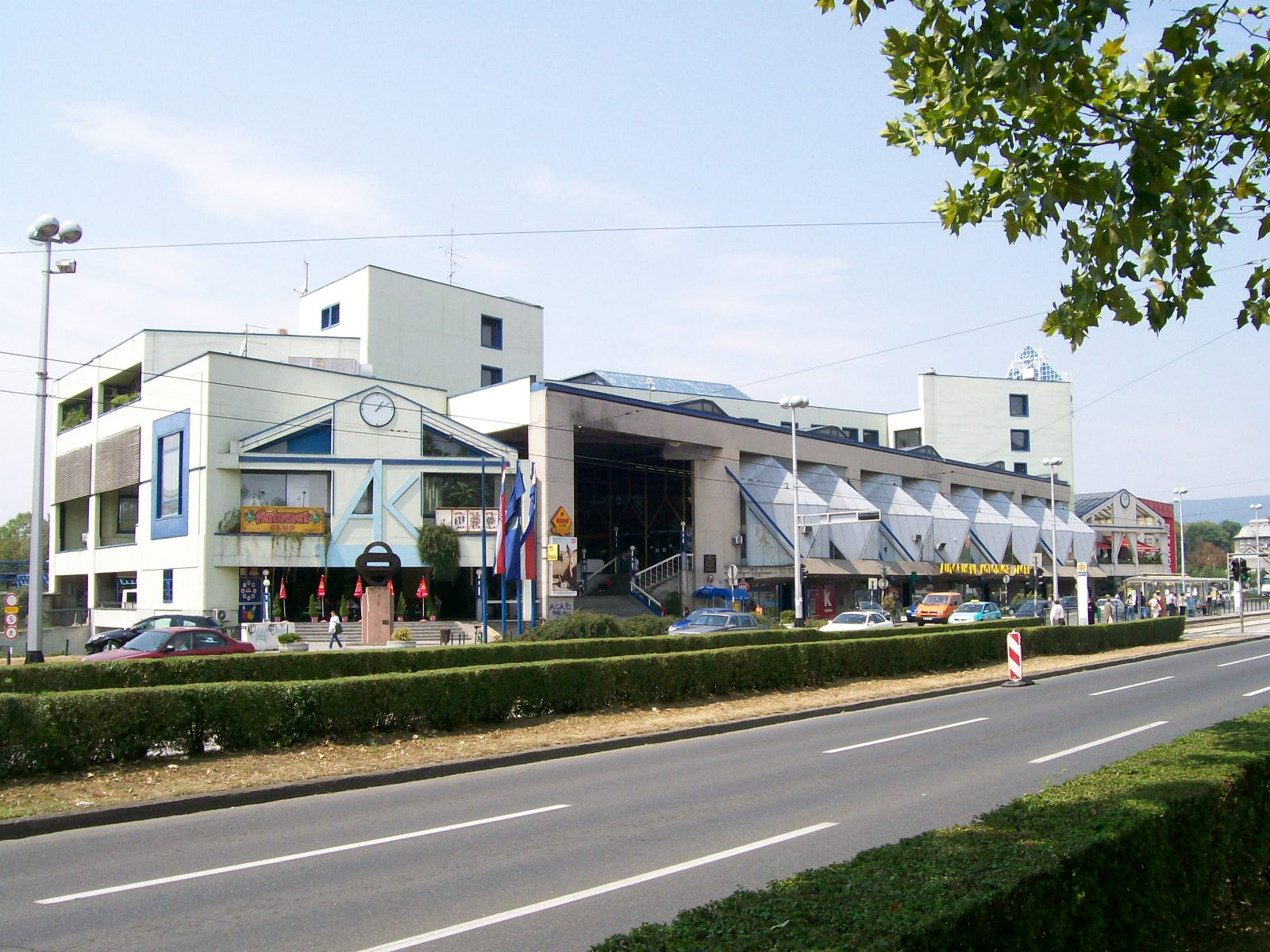
Zagreb Bus Station

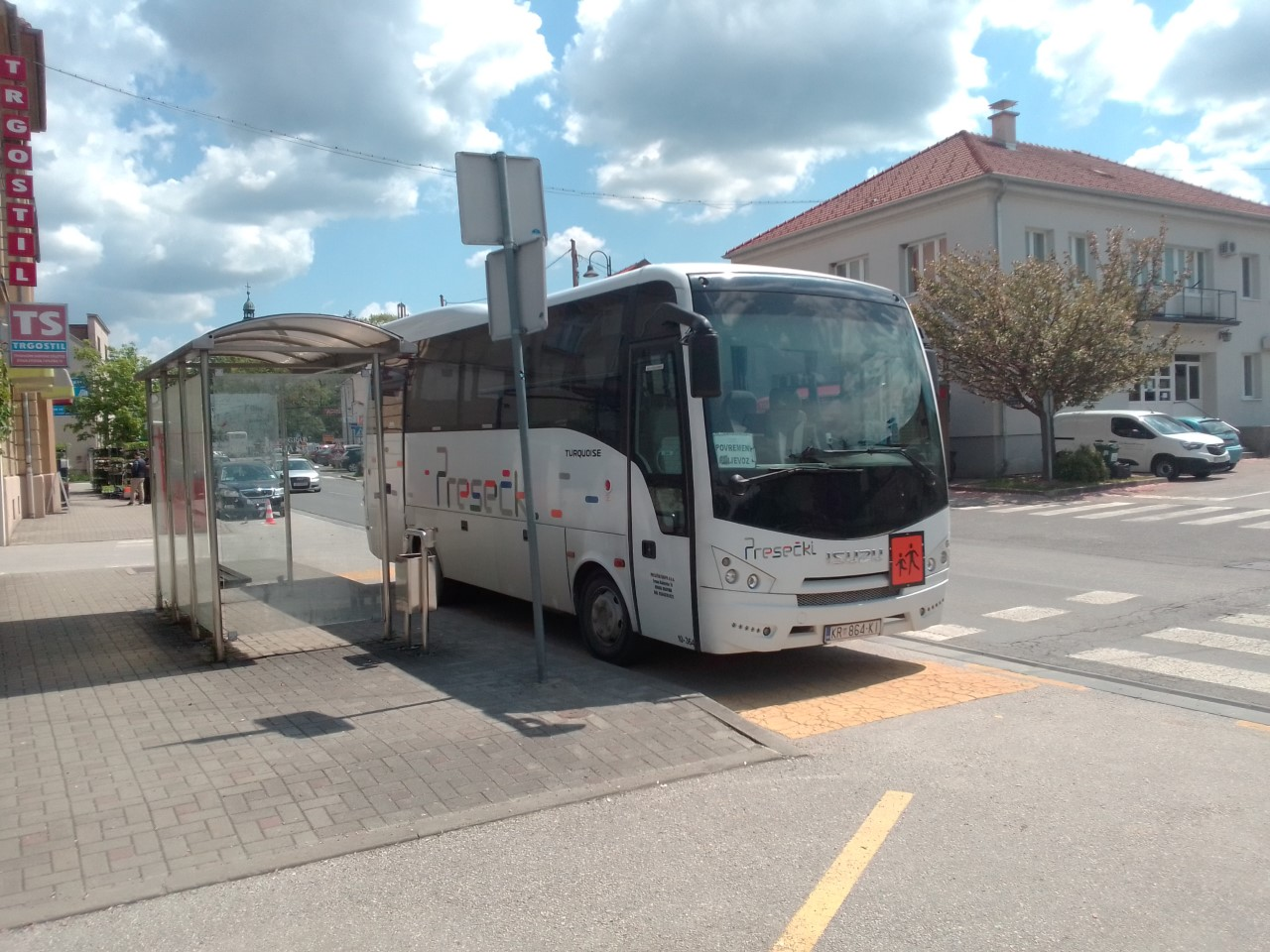
Bus from the company "Presečki d.o.o." at Donja Stubica bus stop

Buses represent the most-accepted, cheapest and widely used means of public transport. National bus traffic is very well developed - from express buses that cover longer distances to bus connections between the smallest villages in the country, therefore it's possible to reach most of the remotest parts of Croatia by bus on a daily basis. Every larger town usually has a bus station with the ticket office(s) and timetable information. Buses that run on national lines in Croatia (owned and run by private companies) are comfortable and modern-equipped vehicles, featuring air-conditioning and offering pleasant traveling comfort.

National bus travel is generally divided in inter-city (Međugradski prijevoz), inter-county (Međužupanijski prijevoz) and county (local; Županijski prijevoz) transport. Although there can be bus companies whose primary goal is to serve inter-city lines, a certain bus company can - and most of them usually do - operate all or most of the above-mentioned modes of transport.

The primary goal of intercity buses is to connect the largest cities in the country with each other in the shortest possible time. Buses on inter-city level usually offer far more frequent daily services and shorter riding time than trains, mostly due to the large number of competing companies and great quality of the country's freeway network. According to timetables of bus companies, there are several types of inter-city bus lines. Some lines run directly on the highway to connect certain cities by the shortest route. Other lines run on lower-ranked roads (all the way or part of the way) even when there is a highway alternative, to connect settlements along the way, while some lines run on the highway and sometimes (one time or more) temporarily exit it to serve some smaller settlement nearby, thus giving the opportunity to a certain smaller settlement to be connected by express service.

Buses on county lines usually run between larger cities or towns in a particular county, connecting towns and smaller villages along the way. These buses are mostly used by local residents - students or workers and occasional passengers, so the timetables and line frequencies of these bus routes are mostly adjusted according to the needs of passenger's daily migrations. Since there is no bus terminal in smaller villages, passengers which board buses from those stations buy a ticket from the driver while boarding the bus, unless they have a monthly student or worker pass, in which case they must validate it each time they board the vehicle. Buses running on inter-county lines usually have the same or very similar purpose, except they cross county borders to transport passengers to the more distanced larger town or area.

There are many international bus routes from Croatia to the neighboring countries (Slovenia, Bosnia and Herzegovina, Serbia, Hungary) and to other European countries. International bus services correspond to European standards.

Zagreb has the largest and busiest bus terminal in Croatia. It is located near the downtown in Trnje district on the Marin Držić Avenue. The bus terminal is close to the main railway station and it is easy to reach by tram lines and by car.

== Maritime and river transport ==
=== Maritime transport ===
==== Coastal infrastructure ====
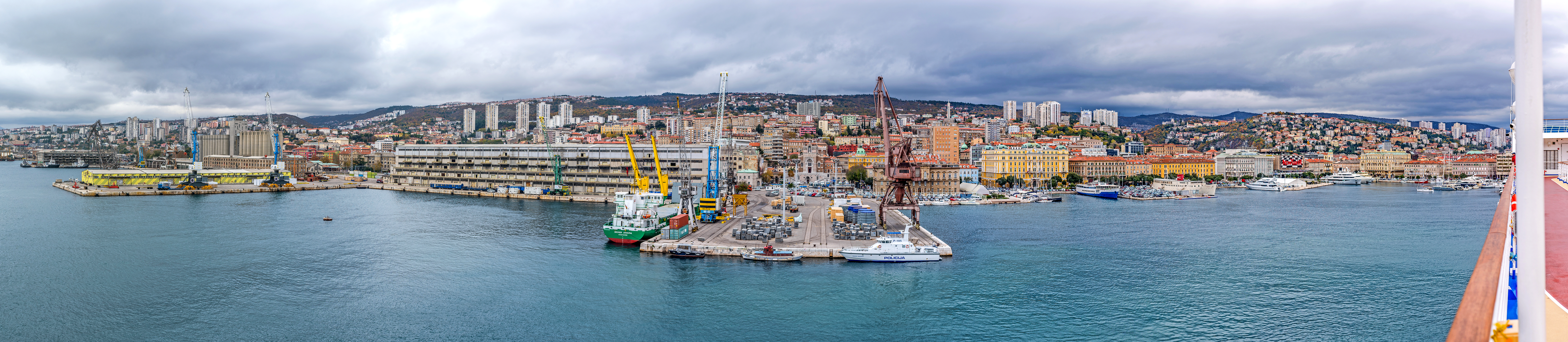
Panorama of Port of Rijeka

Republic of Croatia counts six ports open for public traffic of outstanding (international) economic importance and those are the ports: Rijeka, Zadar, Šibenik, Split, Ploče and Dubrovnik. There are also numerous smaller public ports located along the country's coast.

Rijeka is the country's largest cargo port, followed by Ploče which is of great economic importance for the neighboring Bosnia and Herzegovina. The three most common destinations for foreign cruise ships are the ports of Dubrovnik, Split and Zadar. Split is the country's largest passenger port, serving as the public port for domestic ferry, conventional ship and catamaran services as well as for international ferry, cruise or mega cruise services.

Zadar has two public transport ports opened for passenger traffic – one located in the town center served by conventional ship and catamaran services and the other located in the suburb of Gaženica, serving ferry and cruise ship services. Republic of Croatia defined the need to relieve the Zadar's passenger port and the historic center of Zadar and move ferry traffic from the city center to the new passenger port in Gaženica. Work on the construction of the new port began in 2009, and a new ferry port of approximately 100,000 square meters was opened to traffic in 2015. The advantages of the Port of Gaženica are the short distance from the city center (3.5 kilometers), the proximity of the airport and quality traffic connection with the A1 Motorway. The Port of Gaženica meets multiple traffic requirements - it serves for domestic ferry traffic, international ferry traffic, passenger traffic on mega cruisers and RO-RO traffic, with all the necessary infrastructure and accompanying upgrades. In 2019, the passenger port of Gaženica was named Port of the Year at the most prestigious Seatrade Cruise Awards held in Hamburg.

==== Connection of islands and the mainland ====
Performing of the public transport on national conventional ship, catamaran and ferry lines and all occasional public maritime lines in Croatia is supervised by the government-founded Agency for coastal line traffic (Agencija za obalni linijski promet). Croatia has about 50 inhabited islands along its coast (most of which are reached from either Zadar or Split ports), which means that there is a large number of local car ferry, conventional ship and catamaran connections. The vast majority of Croatian islands have a road network and several ports for public transport - usually a single ferry port and one or more additional ports mostly located near the bay settlements, served exclusively by conventional ships and catamarans. According to sailing schedules or in case of extraordinary conditions, conventional and catamaran ships can also serve ferry ports. There are also very small number of car-free islands that are accessible only by conventional ship or catamaran services, such as Silba in northern Dalmatia.

Regarding national ferry lines, in the lead terms of the number of transported passengers and vehicles are the one between Split and Supetar on the island of Brač (central Dalmatia) and one between Valbiska (island of Krk) and Merag (island of Cres) in northern Kvarner Gulf. Ferry line between Zadar and Preko on the island of Ugljan (northern Dalmatia) is the most frequent one in Croatia and the rest of the Adriatic - in the summer sailing schedule on this 3-nautical-mile-long line (5.6 km; 3.5 mi) there is around 20 departures per day in each direction. The longest ferry line in Croatia is Zadar - Ist - Olib - Silba (passenger service only) - Premuda - Mali Lošinj (63.4 nautical miles; 117.4 km; 73.0 mi), while the shortest one is between Biograd na Moru and Tkon on the island of Pašman (1.4 nautical miles; 2.6 km; 1.6 mi), both operating in northern Dalmatia.

Almost all ferry lines in Croatia are provided by the state-owned shipping company Jadrolinija, except the ferry service between Stinica and Mišnjak on the island of Rab (Kvarner Gulf area) which is operated by the company “Rapska Plovidba d.d”. Catamaran and passenger ship services are operated by Jadrolinija and several other companies such as "Krilo - Kapetan Luka", "G&V Line Iadera", Tankerska plovidba, "Miatours d.o.o." etc. Jadrolinija alone provides a total of 34 national lines with almost 600 departures per day during the summer tourist season, when the number of ferry, conventional ship and catamaran lines on the most capacity-demanding routes is significantly higher compared to the off-season period.

==== International routes ====
With its largest vessels, Jadrolinija connects Croatia with Italy by operating international cross-Adriatic routes Split - Ancona - Split, Zadar - Ancona - Zadar and Dubrovnik - Bari - Dubrovnik. Ferry line between Split and Ancona is also operated by Italian operator SNAV.

=== River transport ===
Croatia is also on the important Danube waterway which connects Eastern and Central Europe. The major Danube port is Vukovar, but there are also some smaller ports in Osijek, Sisak and Slavonski Brod.

Navigable rivers:

- Danube(E 80) - 137,5 km from entering Croatia near Batina to exits near Ilok; VIc class
- Sava(E 80–12) - 383.2 km from Sisak until it exits Croatia near Gunja; II-IV class
- Drava(E 80–08) - 14 km from the mouth of the Danube to Osijek; IV class

Total waterway length (2021): 534.7 km

== Pipelines ==
The projected capacity of the oil pipeline is 34 million tons of oil per year, and the installed 20 million tons of oil per year. The system was built for the needs of refineries in Croatia, Slovenia, Serbia and Bosnia and Herzegovina, as well as users in Hungary, the Czech Republic and Slovakia. The total capacity of the storage space today is 2,100,000 m3 for crude oil and 242,000 m3 for petroleum products. The pipeline is 631 kilometres (392 miles) long and it is fully controlled by JANAF. The system consists of: reception and dispatch Terminal Omišalj on the island of Krk, with two berths for tankers and storage space for oil and derivatives, receiving and dispatching terminals in Sisak, Virje and Slavonski Brod with oil storage space at the Sisak and Virje terminals, Žitnjak Terminal in Zagreb, for storage of petroleum products with railway and truck transfer stations for delivery, reception and dispatch of derivatives.

Natural gas is transported by Plinacro, which operates 2,549 kilometres (1,584 miles) of the transmission system in 19 counties, with more than 450 overhead transmission system facilities, including a compressor station and 156 metering and reduction stations through which gas is delivered to system users. The system houses the Okoli underground storage facility with a working volume of 553 million cubic meters of natural gas.

== Public transport ==
Public transport within most of the largest cities (and their suburbs/satellite towns) in Croatia is mostly provided by the city buses owned and operated by municipal organizations such as Zagreb Electric Tram in Zagreb, Promet Split in Split, Autotrolej in Rijeka, Liburnija Zadar in Zadar, Gradski Prijevoz Putnika in Osijek, etc.

In addition to city buses, the cities of Zagreb and Osijek have tram networks. Tram lines in Zagreb are operated by Zagreb Electric Tram (which also operates a single funicular line - mostly for tourist purposes - and a gondola lift system), while the tram lines in Osijek are operated by Gradski Prijevoz Putnika. Tram network in the capital city of Zagreb is, however, far more extensive than the one in Osijek.

== See also ==
- Croatian car number plates
- Transport in Zagreb
- Hrvatske autoceste
- Croatian Railways
- List of E-roads in Croatia
