= Pan-European Corridor Xa =

Road in Europe

- Pan-European Corridor X highlighted in red

Major junctions
- Start end: Graz (Austria)
- End end: Zagreb (Croatia)

Location
- Countries: Austria, Slovenia, and Croatia

Highway system
- Pan-European corridors

The Corridor Xa is a branch of the Pan-European Corridor X. It runs north–south between the cities of Graz and Zagreb through three countries: Austria, Slovenia and Croatia. The road route of Corridor Xa is concurrent with the European route E59 throughout its entire length.

== Road route ==
The corridor starts at the A9 (Pyhrn Autobahn) highway in Graz, Austria. It follows the highway from the junction with the A2 and the European route E66 for 41 km (25 mi) to the border with Slovenia at Spielfeld.

In Slovenia the corridor continues from the Austrian border at Šentilj for 25 km (16 mi) along the A1 motorway (Slovenika) to the city of Maribor and the Slivnica. There it switches to the A4 motorway for 20 km (12 mi) until Draženci near Ptuj, continuing (while A4 construction is in progress) on the G9 main road for a few dozen kilometers to the Croatian border at Gruškovje.

In Croatia the corridor follows the A2 toll highway for 64 km (40 mi) from Macelj to Zagreb outskirts. The highway has three to six lanes throughout its entire length. Upon approaching Zaprešić interchange in suburban Zagreb, small backups on the mainline toll plaza are encountered at all times of day. The last part of the Corridor between Zaprešić and Lučko interchanges is part of the Zagreb bypass. Congestion can be bad at rush hour near interchanges, though.

== Rail Corridor ==
=== Austria ===
The Southern Railway from Graz 46 km electrified with 15 kV 16.7 Hz AC to Slovenia at Spielfeld, with 36% double track from Lebring to Wagna.

=== Slovenia ===
The Spielfeld–Straß-Trieste railway from Austria at Sentilji 108 km electrified using the Italian 3 kV DC, via Maribor and Pragersko to Zidani Most, with 84.8% double track from Maribor, with the remainder from Sentilji planned by 2026.
