= A2 (Croatia) =

Motorway in Croatia

A2 motorway
- Autocesta A2
- Zagorska autocesta
- in use other motorways

Route information
- Part of E59
- Length: 60.0 km (37.3 mi)

Major junctions
- North end: E59 / A4 at Macelj border crossing
- D1 in Krapina interchange; D307 in Zabok interchange; D225 in Zaprešić interchange

- South end: A3 / D1 / Ž1035 near Zagreb

Location
- Country: Croatia
- Counties: City of Zagreb, Zagreb, Krapina-Zagorje
- Major cities: Zagreb, Krapina

Highway system
- Highways in Croatia

The A2 motorway (Croatian: Autocesta A2) is a motorway in the Hrvatsko Zagorje region of northern Croatia, connecting Zagreb to the Macelj border crossing with Slovenia. The A2 motorway is part of the European route E59 and the Pan-European Corridor Xa. The motorway spans 59.2 kilometres (36.8 mi) between the Slovenian border and the Jankomir interchange within the Zagreb bypass, providing road connections to a number of cities and towns besides Zagreb, including Krapina, Zabok and Zaprešić. All sections of the motorway, except the northernmost one between the Macelj border crossing and Trakošćan, and the southernmost one near Zagreb, are tolled, using a closed toll collection system.

Construction of the motorway began in 1990, but a decade-long hiatus between the mid-1990s and 2004 caused by funding issues and the setting up of a separate company to develop and operate the motorway meant it was not completed until 2007. As of July 2011, the entire motorway route is completed, consisting of a dual-carriageway and four traffic lanes, except for a relatively short segment which is still a single carriageway road. The motorway is currently operated by Autocesta Zagreb – Macelj.

The motorway carries a considerable volume of traffic throughout the year; however, in the summer, its peak volume is nearly double the average, as traffic intensifies because of tourists travelling to and from Adriatic Sea resorts. Furthermore, the southernmost sections of the motorway serve Zagreb's sizeable suburban traffic.

== Route description ==
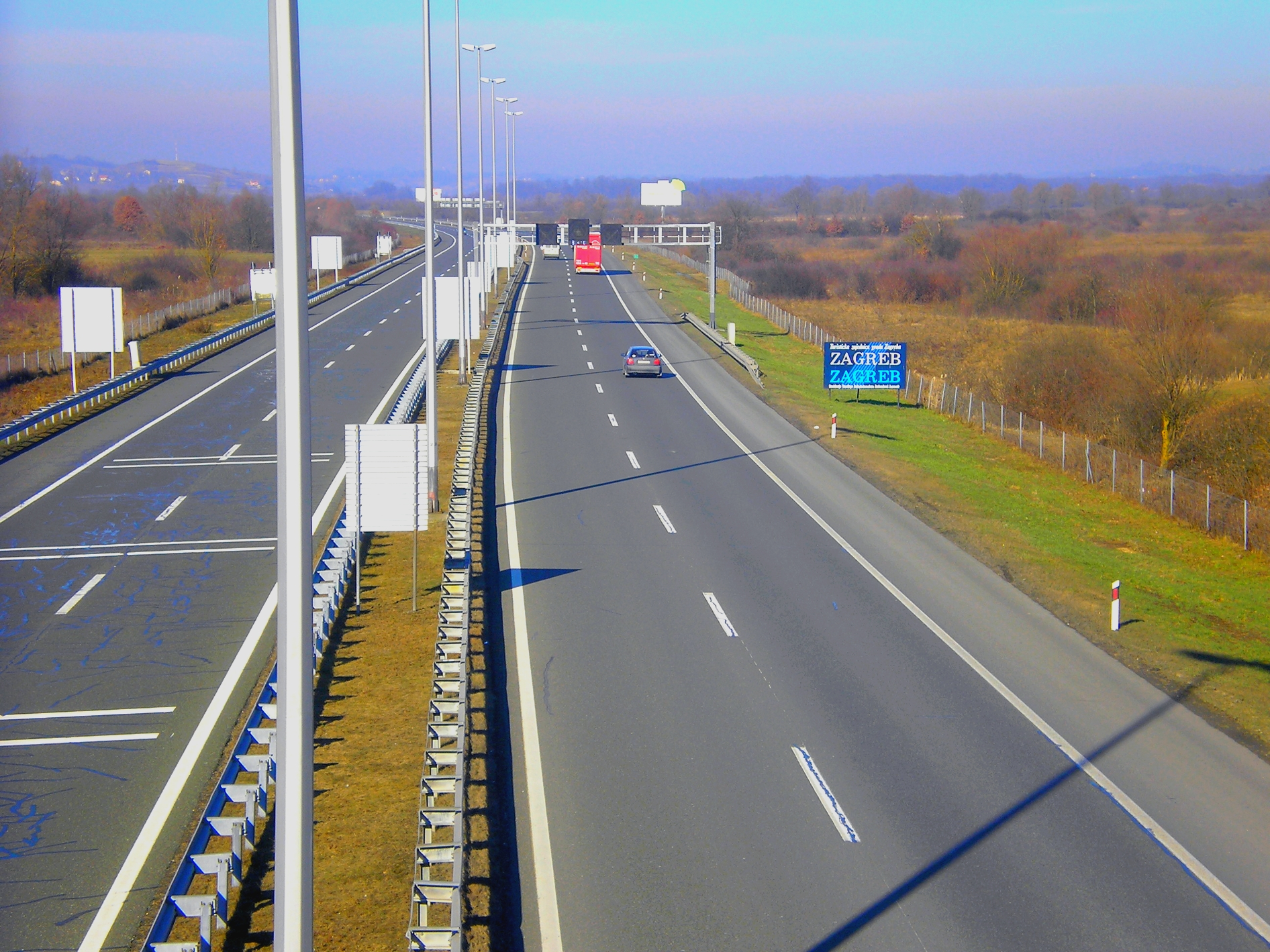
A2 near the Zaprešić mainline toll plaza

The A2 motorway is an important north–south motorway in Croatia, connecting the capital of the country, Zagreb, to Graz, Austria, via Maribor, Slovenia, as well as Vienna and other destinations along the Pyhrn route. The motorway follows a route through the Hrvatsko Zagorje region. Part of the road network of Croatia, the motorway is also part of European route E59 Zagreb–Graz–Vienna–Prague. The motorway is of major importance to Croatia in terms of economic development, especially for tourism and as a transit transport route. The road carries significant transit and tourist traffic as it connects to the Zagreb bypass segment of the A3 motorway, which serves as a hub distributing the southbound traffic to either eastbound A3 or southbound A1, and vice versa. As of the June 1997 Pan-European Transport Conference in Helsinki, the motorway is part of the Pan-European Corridor Xa.

The motorway spans 59.2 kilometres (36.8 mi) between the Macelj border crossing with Slovenia and the Zagreb–Jankomir interchange on the A3 motorway. The route serves Zagreb via the Ž1035 at the Jankomir interchange, Zaprešić via the D225, Zabok, Klanjec and Oroslavje via the D307, Sveti Križ Začretje via the D35, Krapina and Pregrada via the D206, Đurmanec via the D207 and Trakošćan via the D508. The D1 state road runs as a parallel, toll-free route along the motorway, and most of the motorway exits connect to that route directly, switching to D35, D206, D207 and D508 shortly afterwards.

The A2 motorway has at least two traffic lanes and an emergency lane in each direction along its entire length, except in tunnels, where there are emergency bays instead. All of the interchanges are trumpet interchanges, except the Jankomir and Zaprešić interchanges, which are cloverleaf interchanges. There are a number of rest areas along the motorway providing various types of services, ranging from simple parking spaces and restrooms to filling stations, restaurants and hotels. As of July 2011, the motorway has seven interchanges providing access to numerous towns and cities and the Croatian state road network. The motorway is operated by the Autocesta Zagreb–Macelj company.

An automatic traffic monitoring and guidance system is in place along the motorway. It consists of measuring, control and signalling devices located in zones where driving conditions may vary, such as at interchanges, viaducts, bridges, tunnels and zones where fog and strong wind are known to occur. The system uses variable traffic signs to communicate changing driving conditions, possible restrictions and other information to motorway users. The A2 motorway mainly runs through the plains and rolling hills of Hrvatsko Zagorje region, although the northernmost sections of the route traverse rugged terrain, requiring a number of viaducts and long tunnels along the route.

== Toll ==
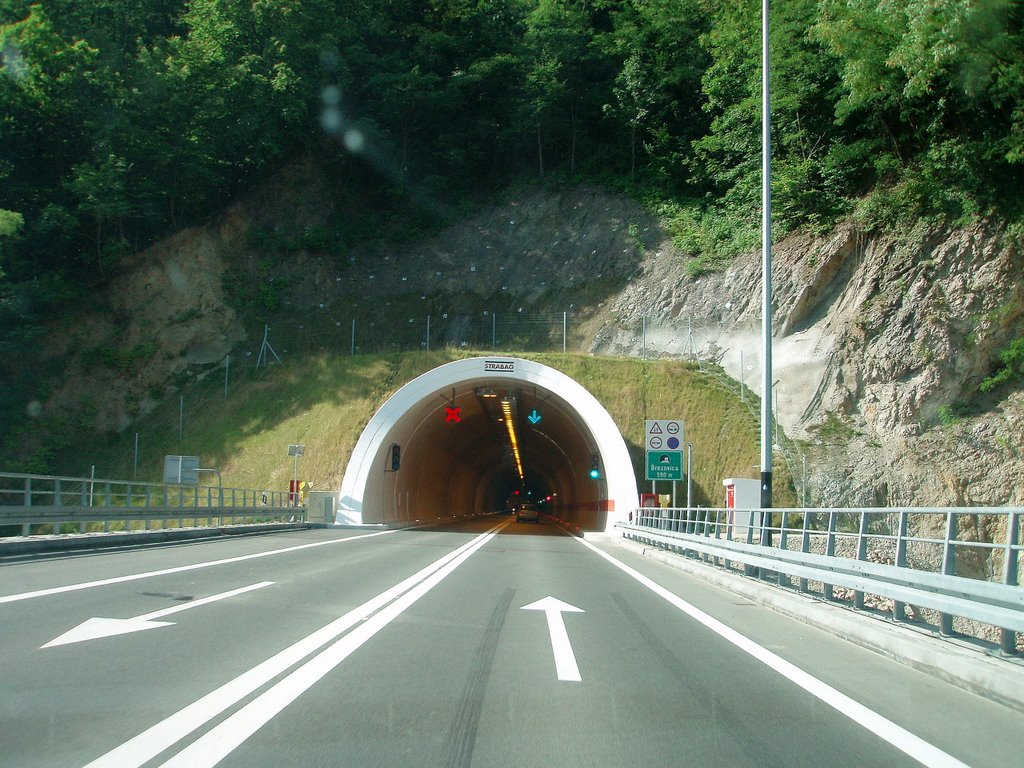
Brezovica Tunnel

The A2 is a tolled motorway, based on the vehicle classification in Croatia, using a closed toll system. As of July 2011, the toll charged along the A2 route between the Zaprešić and Trakošćan mainline toll plazas varies depending on the length of route travelled, ranging from 1.00 kuna (0.13 euros) to 42.00 kuna (5.48 euros) for passenger cars and 47.00 kuna (6.13 euro) to 187.00 kuna (24.40 euro) for semi-trailer trucks. The toll is payable in either Croatian kuna or euros and by major credit and debit cards. A prepaid toll collection system is also used. The A2 is the only motorway in Croatia which does not provide for use of the ENC—an electronic toll collection (ETC) system shared by most motorways in Croatia that provides drivers with discounted toll rates for dedicated lanes at toll plazas. In addition to the vehicle classification in Croatia, the motorway operator maintains an additional vehicle category for motorbikes, which are charged from 7.00 kuna (0.91 euros) to 25.00 kuna (3.26 euros) toll. The southernmost Jankomir–Zaprešić section of the motorway is not tolled, as it is part of the Zagreb bypass.

The toll collected by Autocesta Zagreb–Macelj from the A2 motorway in the first quarter of 2011 amounted to 27.7 million kuna (3.61 million euros); however, this period does not include the significantly increased tourist traffic during the summer. In 2010, Autocesta Zagreb–Macelj collected 166.9 million kuna (22.4 million euros) from A2 tolls.

== Notable structures ==
The southernmost section of the motorway, between the Jankomir and Zaprešić interchanges, forms part of the Zagreb bypass and entails a number of viaducts spanning roads and railways, including a 373-metre (1,224 ft) viaduct across the Zagreb–Ljubljana railway. Furthermore, the section comprises the Sava River Bridge, spanning 1,072 metres (3,517 ft). All the structures along the section are executed as dual structures with four traffic lanes.

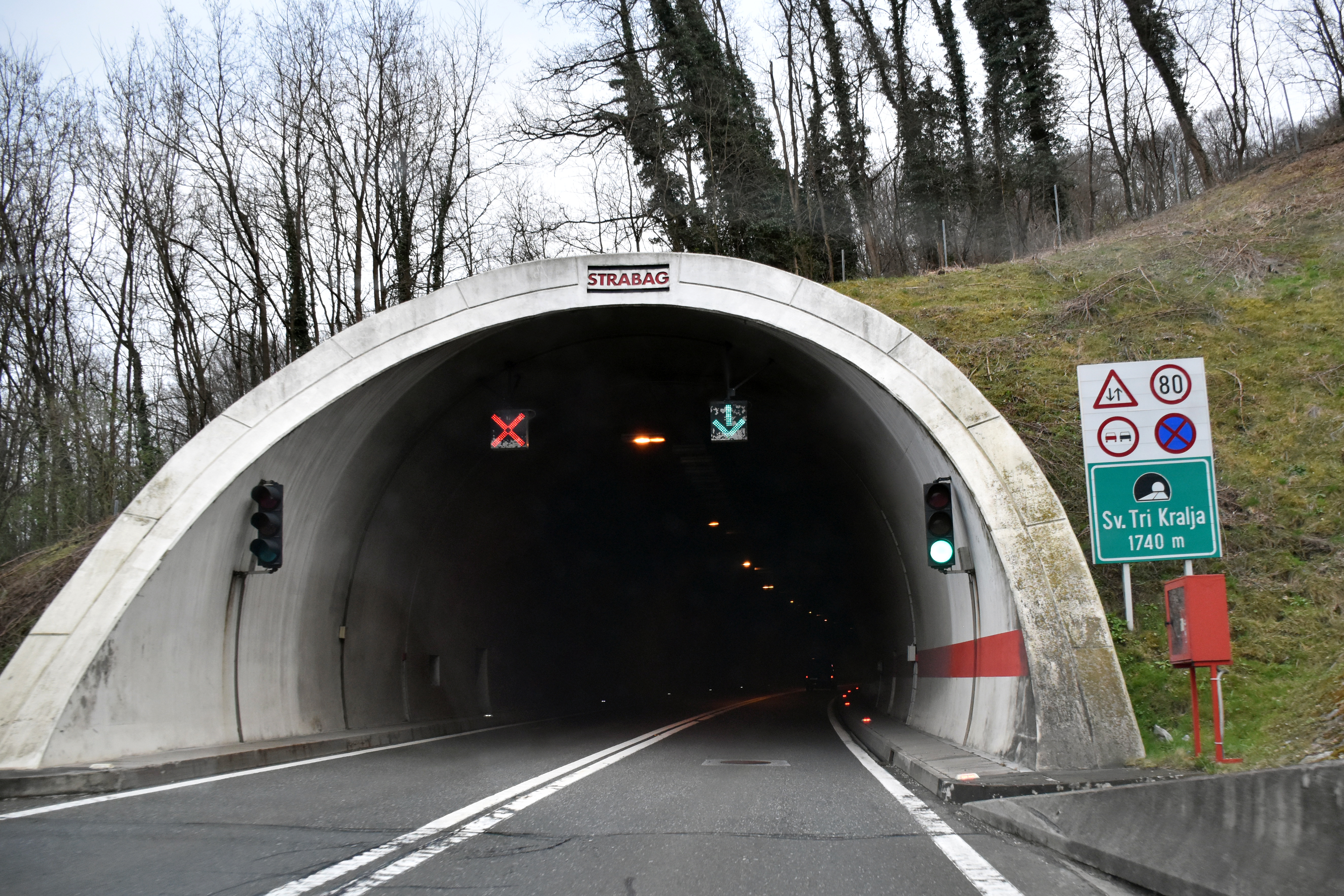
Sveta Tri Kralja Tunnel at A2 motorway

The northernmost segment between the Krapina interchange and the Macelj border crossing traverses rugged terrain, requiring further viaducts and tunnels. Among those, the most notable ones are the 579-metre (1,900 ft) Krapinčica Viaduct and the 1,740-metre (5,710 ft) Sveta Tri Kralja Tunnel. The tunnel is part of a sequence of two tunnels and three viaducts in a 3.7-kilometre (2.3 mi) segment between Krapina and Đurmanec. Generally, the Krapina–Macelj border crossing segment of the A2 motorway required numerous expensive engineering works, including six tunnels and nine viaducts, which caused the construction cost to be over 235 million euros.

== History ==
The first section of the present A2 motorway was completed as a single-carriageway limited-access road between the Jankomir and Zaprešić interchanges, forming the westernmost section of Zagreb bypass, in 1980. The section included a number of bridges and viaducts, spanning the Sava River and numerous roads and railroads, making construction of a dual-carriageway prohibitively expensive at the time. In 1991, the 7.4-kilometre (4.6 mi) section was extended by 17 kilometres (11 mi) of dual-carriage motorway to Zabok (more precisely to the nearby village of Gubaševo). Lack of funding greatly slowed further construction, and the following 16.2-kilometre (10.1 mi) section to Velika Ves south of Krapina, was only completed in 1996, which also included the construction of Gubaševo interchange. This part of motorway was built at the site of the so-called "Zagorje Highway" (Croatian: Zagorska Magistrala) – a limited-access two-lane expressway built in 1950's and 1960's that connected Slovenian border through Hrvatsko Zagorje with Zagreb, which today exists only in the southern part of its original route (between Zaprešić interchange and Gubaševo – where it terminates in the immediate vicinity of the motorway interchange).

In 1997, the governments of the Republic of Croatia and the German state of Bavaria made a joint declaration regarding their future transport infrastructure development cooperation. The cooperation primarily dealt with the construction of the remaining A2 motorway sections and the Franjo Tuđman Bridge, and the two issues were formally settled between the Croatian government and Walter Bau AG. In 2003, the Autocesta Zagreb–Macelj company was established by the Croatian government and was awarded a concession contract to operate the motorway. Furthermore, a joint investment agreement with Walter Bau AG was signed by the government, effectively securing the financial assets required to resume construction. In 2004, Strabag replaced Walter Bau AG as a contract partner and construction finally resumed. In 2006, the section between Jankomir and Zaprešić was upgraded to dual-carriage motorway, and the motorway was extended to Krapina itself. In 2007, after 33 months of construction defined by the contracts, the motorway was completed along its entire length, except for a short segment near Krapina which, as of July 2011, is still a single-carriageway road. The total cost of the motorway was approximately 372 million euros. The largest portion of the total pertains to the northernmost 20-kilometre (12 mi) section between Krapina and Macelj, which was reported to cost 235 million euros.

== Further construction ==
The company Autocesta Zagreb-Macelj received a location permit in January 2021 to upgrade 3.7-kilometre (2.3 mi) of full profile on the section of the Đurmanec-Macelj highway, and the building permit is expected in the first half of 2022, while work is expected to begin in autumn 2022. The cost of construction is estimated at 70 million euros, and the entire project has been applied for funding from the EU Recovery Fund.

Of the total 3.7-kilometre (2.3 mi) of the section, only 500-metre (1,600 ft) of the route are open road; everything else is facilities. The largest facility is the Sveta Tri Kralja Tunnel, 1,740-metre (5,710 ft) long, where a new tunnel pipe needs to be dug. During the construction of this tunnel, a service pipe of about 1,400-metre (4,600 ft) was dug, which should be dug to the end and a tunnel pipe for traffic should be made. An additional 600-metre (2,000 ft) long pipe from the Brezovica tunnel should also be dug. In addition, new viaducts should be built – Šumi (173 m), Puhi (237 m) and Ravninščica (397 m). It is estimated that the works themselves could last as long as two years.

== Traffic volume ==
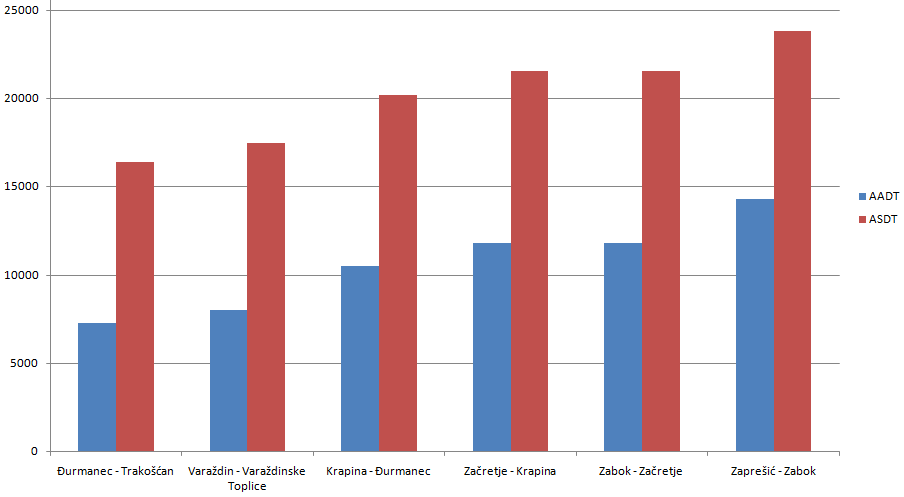
2010 A2 traffic volume by section

Traffic is regularly counted and reported by Autocesta Zagreb–Macelj, the operator of the motorway, and is published by Hrvatske Ceste. As the motorway traffic volume is measured through an analysis of toll ticket sales, the southernmost section of the motorway, Jankomir – Zaprešić, is not included in this report, as it is not tolled. However, since the section is a part of Zagreb bypass, it is considered to carry heavier traffic than any other section of the A2 motorway. In 2006, it carried more than 22,000 vehicles per day, and its traffic volume grew considerably since the completion of the motorway in 2007.

Variations between AADT and average summer daily traffic (ASDT) traffic volumes are attributed to the fact that the motorway carries substantial tourist traffic to the Adriatic Sea resorts during the summer. On average, the tolled section of the A2 motorway carries 90% more ASDT than AADT. The largest increase, 125%, of the ASDT relative to the AADT is observed on the Đurmanec–Trakošćan section.

A2 traffic volume details
Road	Counting site	AADT	ASDT	Notes
A2	1114 Đurmanec north	7,307	16,425	Between Đurmanec and Trakošćan junctions.
A2	1113 Krapina north	8,034	17,480	Between Krapina and Đurmanec junctions.
A2	1116 Začretje north	10,539	20,213	Between Začretje and Krapina junctions.
A2	1115 Mokrice north	11,813	21,566	Between Zabok and Začretje junctions.
A2	1904 Zaprešić north	14,308	23,843	Between Zaprešić and Zabok junctions.

== Rest areas ==
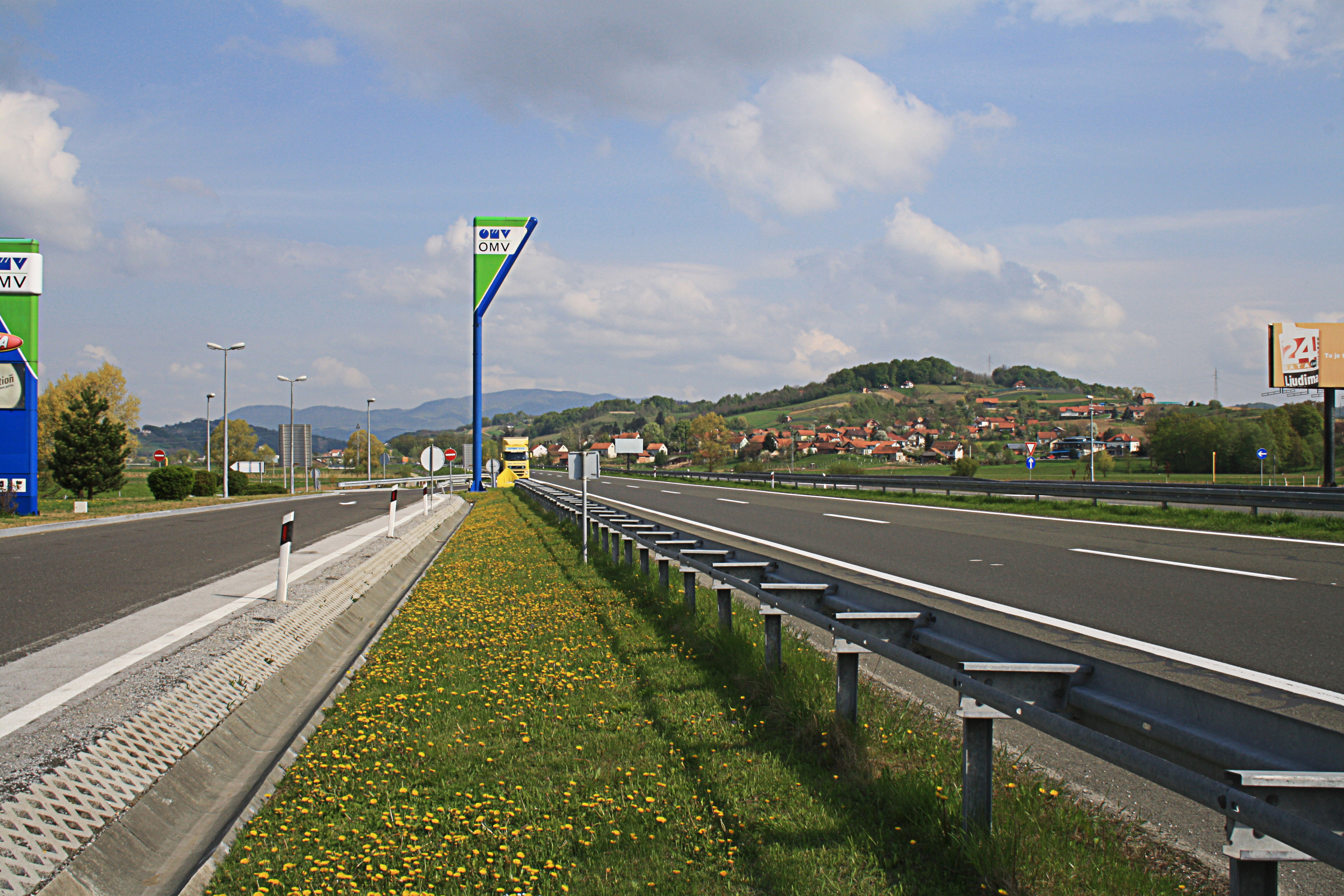
Sveti Križ Začretje

As of July 2011, there are three rest areas along the A2 motorway. Legislation identifies four types of rest areas designated as types A through D: A-type rest areas comprise a full range of amenities, including a filling station, a restaurant and a hotel or motel; B-type rest areas have no lodging; C-type rest areas are very common and include a filling station and a café, but no restaurants or accommodations; D-type rest areas only offer parking spaces, possibly picnicking tables and benches and restrooms. Most rest areas along the A2 motorway generally follow this ranking system, although some offer extra services. Many filling stations have small convenience stores, and some offer LPG fuel.

The primary motorway operator, Hrvatske autoceste (HAC), leases the A, B and C type rest areas to various operators through public tenders. As of July 2011, there are two such rest area operators on the A2 motorway: INA and OMV. The rest area operators are not permitted to sub-lease the fuel operations. The A2 motorway rest areas are accessible from both directions of the motorway and operate 24 hours a day, 7 days a week.

List of A2 motorway rest areas
County	km	Name	Operators	Type	Notes
Krapina‑Zagorje	4.1	Lepa Bukva	INA	C	Facilities found at the Lepa Bukva rest area comprise a filling station selling petrol and diesel fuel, a café and restrooms.
Krapina‑Zagorje	25.5	Sveti Križ Začretje	OMV	B	Facilities found at the Sveti Križ Začretje rest area comprise a filling station selling petrol and diesel fuel, a restaurant, a café and restrooms.
Zagreb County	44.0	Jakovlje	INA	C	Facilities found at the Jakovlje rest area comprise a filling station selling petrol and diesel fuel, a café and restrooms.
1.000 mi = 1.609 km; 1.000 km = 0.621 mi

== Exit list ==
County	km	Exit	Name	Destination	Notes
Krapina‑Zagorje	0.0	Border crossing within the EU	Macelj border crossing	A4 E59	Macelj border crossing to Slovenia where the road extends as A4 motorway and route 9. The northern terminus of the E59 concurrency. The northern terminus of the motorway.
Krapina‑Zagorje	1.1	1	Trakošćan	D1	Connection to Trakošćan via D508.
Krapina‑Zagorje	1.7		Trakošćan toll plaza		
Krapina‑Zagorje	4.1		Lepa Bukva rest area		
Krapina‑Zagorje	8.9	2	Đurmanec	D1	Connection to Đurmanec via D207.
Krapina‑Zagorje	9.3	The northern end of a half-motorway section of the A2.			
Krapina‑Zagorje		Ravninščica Viaduct			
Krapina‑Zagorje		Brezovica Tunnel			
Krapina‑Zagorje		Sveta Tri Kralja Tunnel			
Krapina‑Zagorje	13.1	The southern end of a half-motorway section of the A2.			
Krapina‑Zagorje	18.0	3	Krapina	D1	Connection to Krapina and Pregrada via D206.
Krapina‑Zagorje	22.9	4	Sveti Križ Začretje	D1	Connection to Sveti Križ Začretje and the D35 state road.
Krapina‑Zagorje	25.5		Sveti Križ Začretje rest area		
Krapina‑Zagorje	35.6	5	Zabok - Oroslavje	D307	Connection to Klanjec, Zabok, Tuheljske Toplice, Tuhelj, Krapinske Toplice, Oroslavje, Donja Stubica and Marija Bistrica.
Zagreb County	44.0		Jakovlje rest area		
Zagreb County	50.2		Zaprešić toll plaza		
Zagreb County	52.6	6	Zaprešić	D1 D225	Connection to Zaprešić and Zagreb via Aleja Bologne and Ilica. The northern terminus of the D1 state road concurrency. The D1 road is not physically signposted along the Zagreb bypass.
Zagreb County	52.9	Sava River Bridge			
City of Zagreb	59.0	7	Zagreb zapad	A3 E59 E70 D1 Ž1035	Connection to A3 motorway in Jankomir interchange and to Zagreb via Ljubljanska Avenue (Ž1035). The southern terminus of the D1 and E59 concurrencies. The southern terminus of the motorway. Southbound A2 traffic defaults to eastbound A3 (E70).
1.000 mi = 1.609 km; 1.000 km = 0.621 mi: Concurrency terminus

== See also ==
- International E-road network
- Transport in Croatia
