= Autocesta Zagreb–Macelj =

Croatian company

Autocesta Zagreb–Macelj d.o.o.
- Company type: Limited liability company
- Industry: Transport
- Founded: 2003
- Headquarters: Lepajci, Croatia
- Key people: Wolfgang Sommerbauer (CEO)
- Revenue: ▲307,241,000 HRK (2021)
- Net income: ▲-2,277,000 HRK (2021)
- Number of employees: 11
- Website: www.azm.hr

Autocesta Zagreb–Macelj (Croatian for "Zagreb–Macelj Motorway") is a Croatian limited liability company founded pursuant to the 27 March 2003 decision of the Croatian government to facilitate construction and subsequent management of a motorway between Zagreb and the Macelj border crossing to Slovenia. The company was subsequently granted concession for construction and management of the A2 motorway, and restructured in the process: The Republic of Croatia retained 49% of ownership stake in the company, while 51% ownership stake was attained by Walter Motorway, owned by Walter Bau AG, Strabag and Dywidag. The company was granted the motorway management concession for a period of 28 years.

The A2 motorway regulated by the concession contract is managed by Egis Road Operation Croatia, a subsidiary of French company Egis Projects.

The company currently manages or develops the following routes:

Number	Control cities (or other appropriate route description)
A2	Macelj border crossing – Jankomir (A3)

The company is managed by the president of the board Miloš Savić and member of the board Ivica Mlinarević.

== See also ==
- Highways in Croatia
- Hrvatske autoceste
- Hrvatske ceste
