= European route E59 =

Road in trans-European E-road network

E59

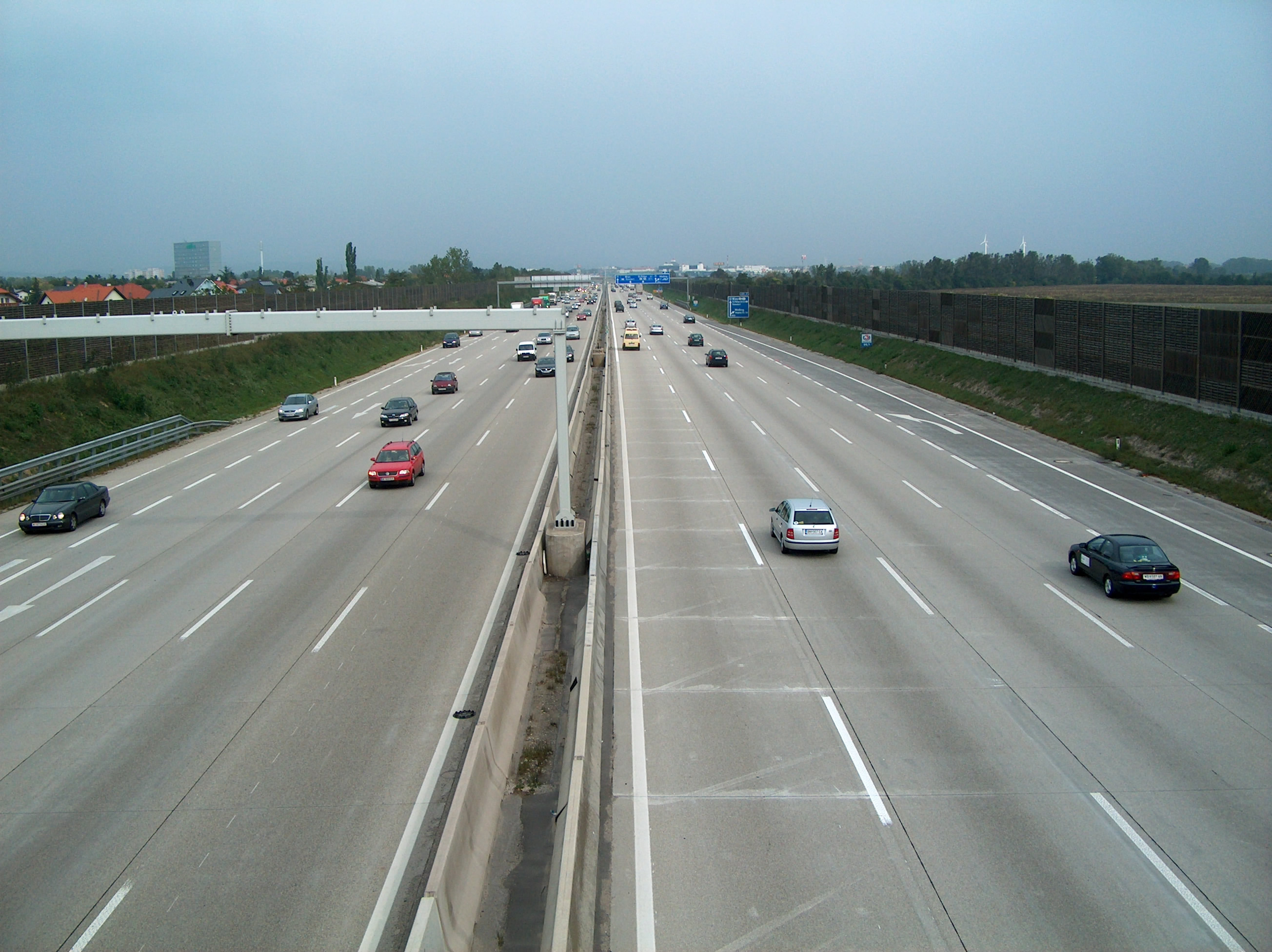
- E59 as Austrian A2 motorway south of Vienna

Route information
- Length: 680 km (420 mi)

Major junctions
- North end: Prague, Czech Republic
- Jihlava; Vienna; Graz; Maribor
- South end: Zagreb, Croatia

Location
- Countries: Czech Republic; Austria; Slovenia; Croatia

Highway system
- International E-road network; A Class; B Class

European route E 59 is a north-south Class-A intermediate European route. It begins in Prague, Czech Republic, passes through Vienna, Austria and Maribor, Slovenia, ending near Zagreb, Croatia. The total length of the route is 644 km (400 mi). The E59 largely consists of motorways but some sections are developed either as expressways or two-lane roads with at-grade intersections. The motorway sections are generally tolled through varying systems and rates. Individual segments of the E59 route are shared with several other European routes. Originally, the route extended through Bihać, Bosnia and Herzegovina to Split, Croatia.

== Route description ==
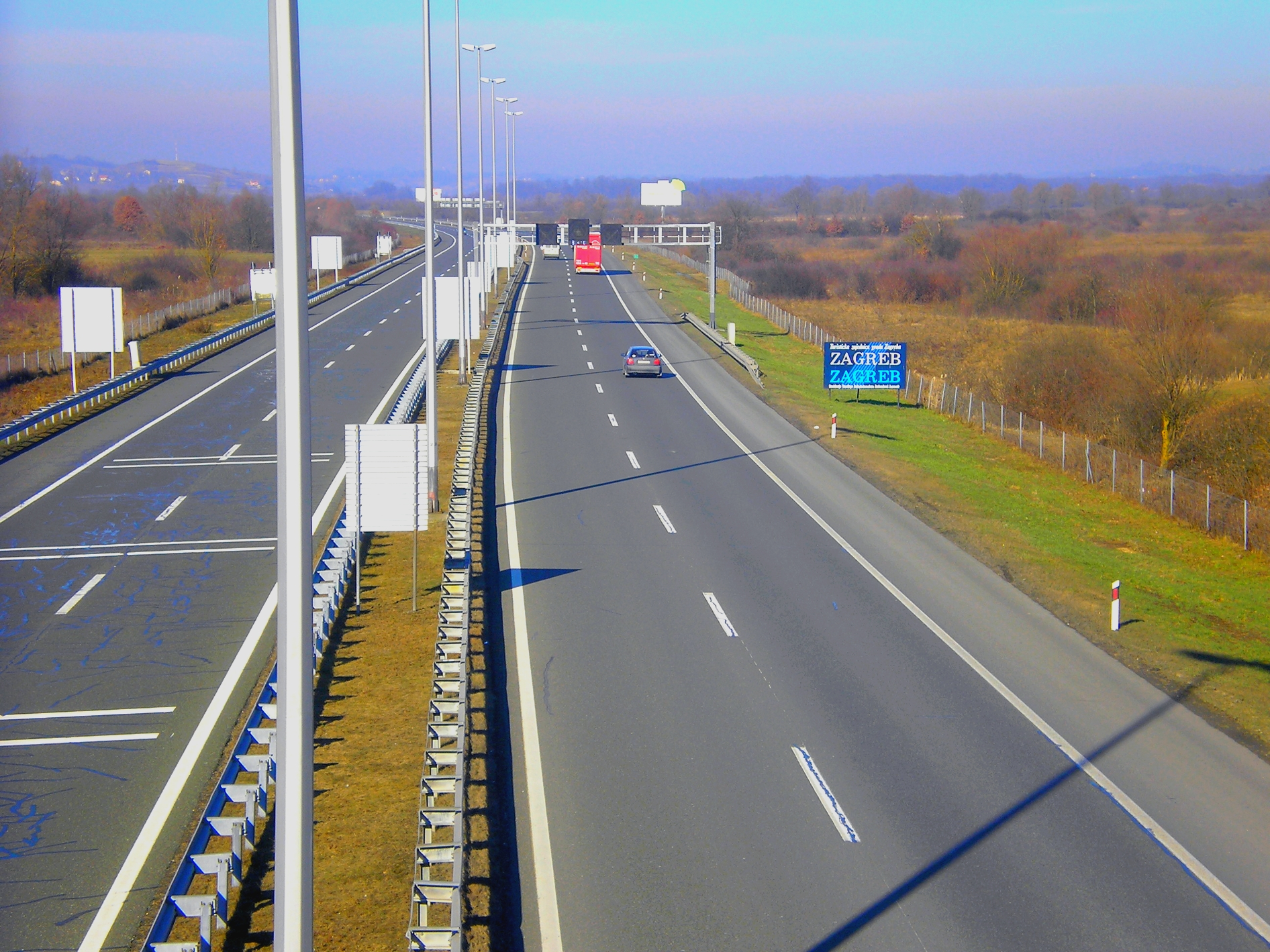
Croatian A2 motorway, near the southern terminus of the E59

Route of the E59 starts in Prague, Czech Republic, and proceeds southeast along the D1 motorway towards Jihlava, where it leaves the motorway and turns south along the route 38, a regular road comprising at-grade intersections. The route passes near Moravské Budějovice and Znojmo. It crosses from the Czech Republic to Austria between Chvalovice and Haugsdorf as it switches to Austrian B303 state road, representing another two-lane road with at-grade intersections. North of Guntersdorf, the E59 transfers to the S3 expressway until it reaches Stockerau and the A22 which carries the E59 east to Vienna. Within the city, the E59 turns south once again in Donaustadt, transferring to the A23 taking it to the southern outskirts of the city. There it proceeds further south along the A2 motorway taking the route past Wiener Neustadt to the city of Graz. Graz itself is bypassed by the motorway and the E59 switches there to the A9 motorway marking the final southbound leg of the E59 through Austria until it reaches Spielfeld/Šentilj border crossing to Slovenia. South of the border crossing the E59 route follows the Slovenian A1 motorway to the south of Maribor where the E59 leaves the A1 route and joins the A4 taking it to Gruškovje/Macelj border crossing to Croatia. South of the border, the E59 follows Croatian A2 motorway running past Krapina to Zagreb. The E59 terminates at Jankomir interchange of the Zagreb bypass, where southbound E59 traffic defaults to the eastbound A3 motorway. Originally the E59 extended further south past Zagreb, to Bihać, Bosnia and Herzegovina and Split at the Adriatic Sea coast, however, that segment of the route was subsequently transferred to the European route E71. Nonetheless, the E59 shares segments of the route with a number of other European routes. A part of the E59 spanning Prague and Vienna corresponds to the Pan-European Corridor IV, and the segment spanning Graz and Zagreb corresponds to the Pan-European Corridor Xa.

== Toll ==
Various sections of the E59 are tolled, using a range of toll collection systems. In Czech Republic, vehicles exceeding 3.5 tonnes (3.4 long tons; 3.9 short tons) using the D1 motorway are charged toll using an electronic toll collection (ETC) system, while other vehicles are required to have a vignette displayed. The same applies to Austrian motorways. Slovenia has a similar system in place, although vehicles exceeding the 3.5 tonnes (3.4 long tons; 3.9 short tons) weight limit are provided with a number of payment options. The Croatian A2 is also a tolled motorway, using a ticket system. As of August 2011, the toll charged along the A2 route between various toll plazas at each motorway exit and two mainline toll plazas, varies depending on the length of route travelled and the vehicle classification in Croatia. The toll is payable in euros and by major credit and debit cards. A prepaid toll collection system is also used.

== History ==
UNECE was formed in 1947, and their first major act to improve transportation was a joint UN declaration no. 1264, the Declaration on the Construction of Main International Traffic Arteries, signed in Geneva on September 16, 1950, which defined the first E-road network. This declaration was amended several times before November 15, 1975, when it was replaced by the European Agreement on Main International Traffic Arteries or "AGR", which set up a route numbering system and improved standards for roads in the list. The AGR went through several changes, with the last one, as of 2011, in 2008. Reorganization of the E-roads network of 1975 and 1983 redefined the E71 designation previously associated with Hanover–Bremen–Bremerhaven road and assigned it to Košice–Budapest–Zagreb route. The same documents assigned the Zagreb–Bihać–Split section to the E59, as the E71 terminated in Zagreb at the time, however, the most recent revision of the E-network truncated the E59 in Zagreb, and transferred its former southern leg to the E71, shortening the E59 considerably.

== Concurrencies ==
Country	km	Route	Control cities	Connecting routes	Notes
Czech Republic	0-114	D1	Prague; Jihlava	R1; 19; 34	Northbound E59 traffic leaving the segment defaults to Brněnská Street in Prague. Southbound E59 traffic leaves the D1 motorway at exit 112A. This segment is concurrent with the E50 and the E65 routes. The northernmost segment of the route.
Czech Republic	114-209	38	Jihlava; Znojmo	23; 53	Regular road with at-grade intersections.
Austria	209-234	B303	Haugsdorf; Guntersdorf	B45	Regular road with at-grade intersections.
Austria	234-255	S3	Guntersdorf; Stockerau	B4; B40	Expressway
Austria	255-285	A22	Stockerau; Vienna	S1; B8	Southbound E59 traffic leaving the segment switches from the A22 to the A23 at Kaisermühlen interchange This segment is concurrent with the E49.
Austria	285-296	A23	Vienna	A4	Northbound E59 traffic leaving the segment switches to the A22 at Kaisermühlen interchange. Southbound E59 traffic leaving the segment switches to the A2 at Inzersdorf interchange.
Austria	296-481	A2	Vienna; Graz	A3; A21; S4; S6	Southbound E59 traffic leaving the segment transfers to the A9 at Graz-West interchange. Northbound E59 traffic leaving the segment transfers to the A23 at Inzersdorf interchange. A part of this segment, between Fürstenfeld and Graz is concurrent with the E66.
Austria	481-522	A9	Graz; Spielfeld	B70	Northbound E59 traffic leaves the A9 at Graz-West interchange. This segment is concurrent with the E57.
Slovenia	522-548	A1	Šentilj; Maribor	A5	Southbound E59 leaves the A1 at Maribor jug interchange. This segment is concurrent with the E57.
Slovenia	548-583	A4	Maribor; Gruškovje	2	
Croatia	583-644	A2	Macelj; Zagreb	A3; D205; D307	Southbound E59 traffic leaving the segment defaults to eastbound A3 (E70) at Jankomir interchange of the Zagreb bypass. The southernmost segment of the route.
1.000 mi = 1.609 km; 1.000 km = 0.621 mi

== See also ==
- European long-distance paths
- Road transport
- Autobahns of Austria
- Motorways in Croatia
- Highways in the Czech Republic
- Highways in Slovenia
