= Macelj massacre =

1945 massacre in Macelj, Croatia

- Part of the Bleiburg repatriations
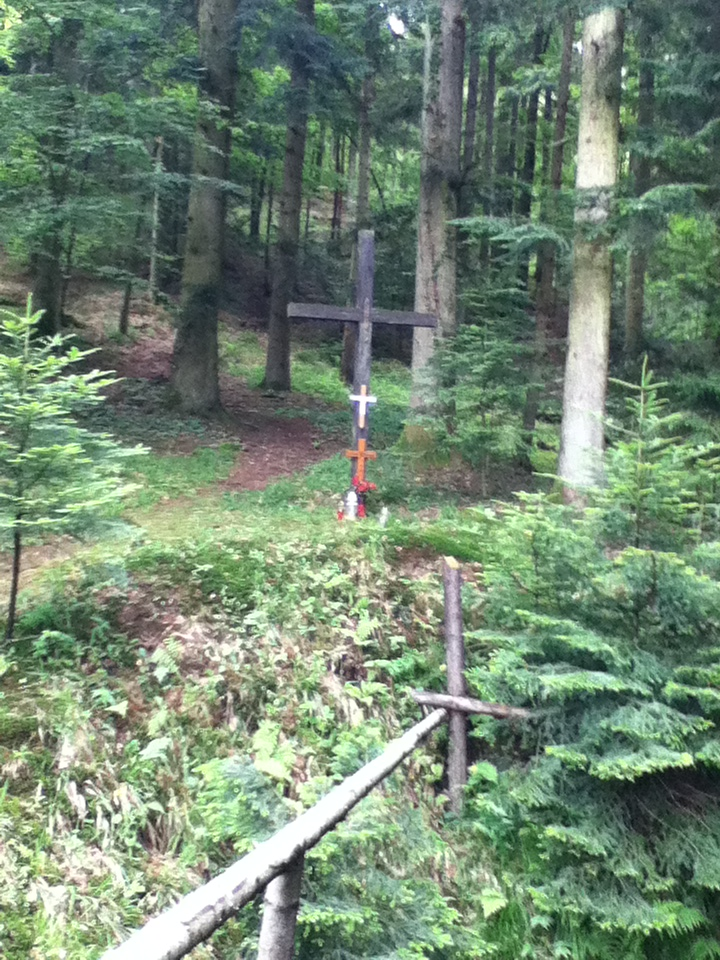
- A cross in Macelj
- Location: Macelj, SR Croatia, Yugoslavia (now Croatia)
- Date: May and June 1945
- Target: NDH prisoners of war and civilians
- Attack type: Mass executions
- Deaths: 1,163+
- Perpetrator: Yugoslav Partisans

The Macelj massacre occurred in May and June 1945, at the end of World War II in Europe, in the forests near Macelj, a village in northern Croatia. At the site, a large number of Croatian soldiers, women, and children were shot during the Bleiburg repatriations.

== Events ==
In 1992, after Croatia became independent, 1,163 bodies were excavated from 23 mass graves in the region, leaving around 130 possible mass grave locations unexplored.

Among those executed in Macelj were 25 Catholic priests from the Franciscan monastery of Široki Brijeg, who were temporarily hiding in nearby Krapina. In 2008, the Croatian Ministry of the Interior launched an investigation into Stjepan Hršak's possible involvement in that event. Some of the executions have been investigated, but no one has ever been prosecuted.

Reburial of the exhumed bodies in 2005 was followed by a public mass led by Cardinal Josip Bozanić, at the time Archbishop of Zagreb.

== See also ==
- Tezno mass graves
- Mass killings under communist regimes
