= Bednja, Varaždin County =

Bednja
- Municipality
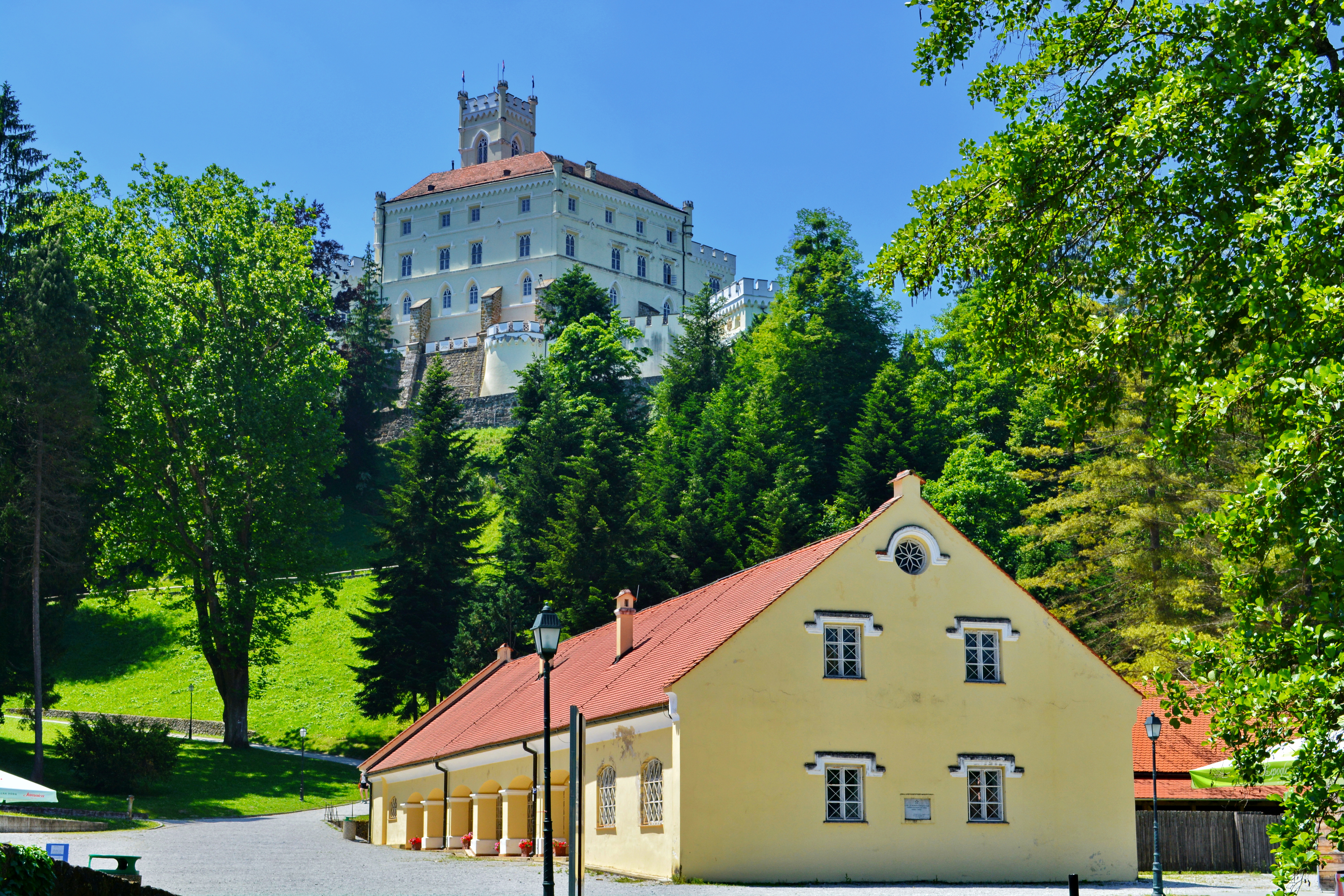
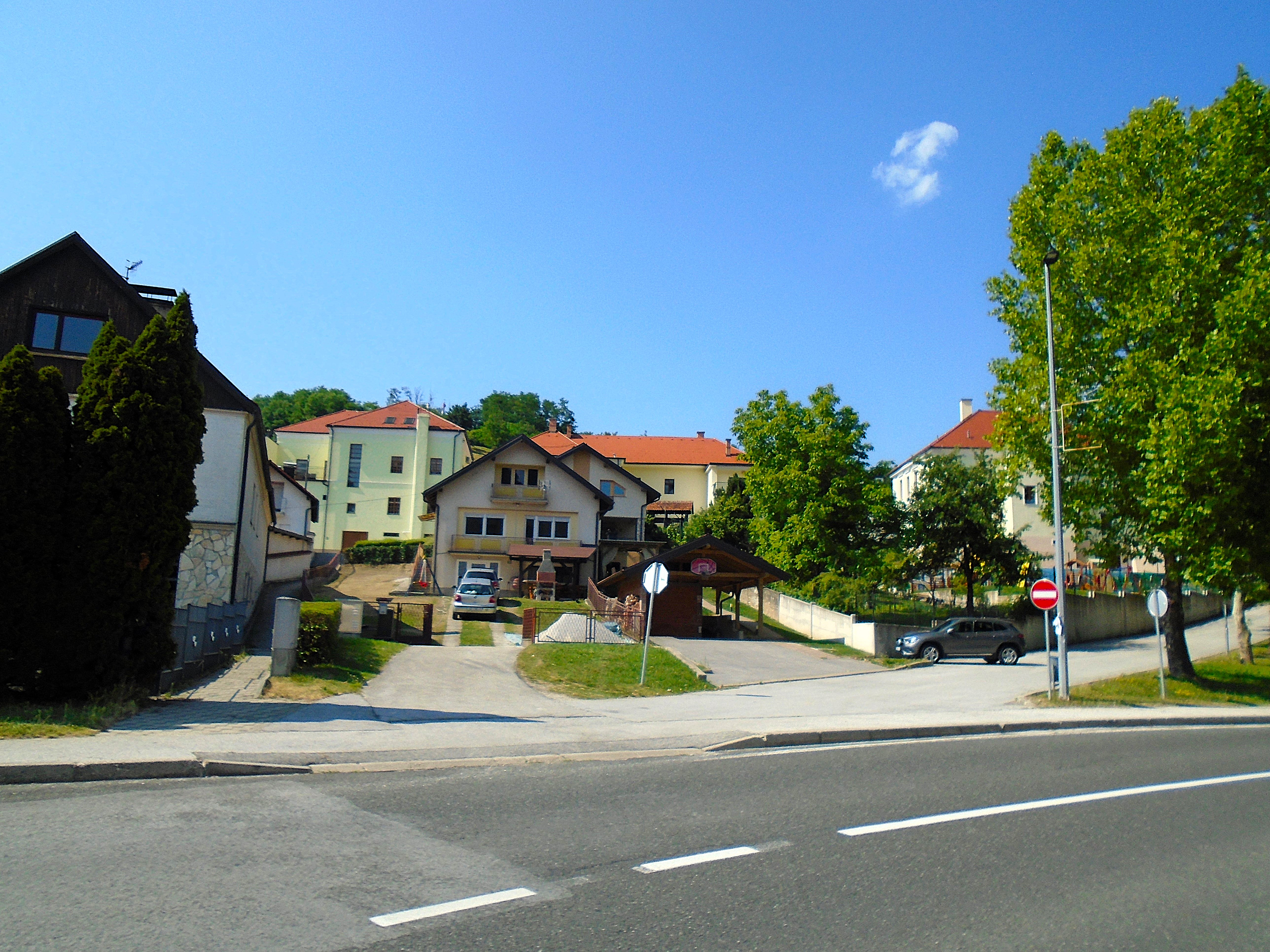
- Trakošćan Castle Houses in the village centre
- Interactive map of Bednja
- Location of Bednja in Croatia
- Coordinates: 46°13′48″N 15°58′48″E
- Country: Croatia
- County: Varaždin County

Government
  - Municipal mayor: Damir Poljak (HDZ)

Area
  - Municipality: 76.2 km^{2} (29.4 sq mi)
  - Urban: 6.0 km^{2} (2.3 sq mi)

Population (2021)
  - Municipality: 3,389
  - Density: 44.5/km^{2} (115/sq mi)
  - Urban: 596
  - Urban density: 99/km^{2} (260/sq mi)
- Time zone: UTC+1 (CET)
  - Summer (DST): UTC+2 (CEST)
- Postal code: 42253 Bednja
- Area code: +385 (0)42
- Website: bednja.hr

Bednja (Croatian pronunciation: [bêdɲa]) is a village and municipality in northern Croatia. It is located in the Varaždin County, west of Lepoglava.

The village is known by its specific local idiom (bednjanski govor), subdialect of Kajkavian, which is protected as the cultural good of Croatia.

== Climate ==
Since records began in 2006, the highest temperature recorded at the local weather station was 37.9 °C (100.2 °F), on 8 August 2013. The coldest temperature was −23.8 °C (−10.8 °F), on 9 February 2012.

== Demographics ==
In the 2021 census, the municipality had a population of 3,389 in the following settlements:

- Bednja, population 596
- Benkovec, population 187
- Brezova Gora, population 56
- Cvetlin, population 251
- Jamno, population 84
- Jazbina Cvetlinska, population 282
- Ježovec, population 234
- Mali Gorenec, population 90
- Meljan, population 101
- Osonjak, population 48
- Pašnik, population 44
- Pleš, population 240
- Podgorje Bednjansko, population 22
- Prebukovje, population 86
- Purga Bednjanska, population 104
- Rinkovec, population 264
- Sveti Josip, population 3
- Šaša, population 86
- Šinkovica Bednjanska, population 87
- Šinkovica Šaška, population 94
- Trakošćan, population 19
- Veliki Gorenec, population 36
- Vranojelje, population 114
- Vrbno, population 228
- Vrhovec Bednjanski, population 33

The majority of inhabitants are Croats, making up 99.2% of the population.

Bednja: Population trends 1857–2021
v

population	6180	6707	7379	8205	9030	10323	10075	10481	10887	10688	9291	8261	6586	5448	4765	3992	3389
	1857	1869	1880	1890	1900	1910	1921	1931	1948	1953	1961	1971	1981	1991	2001	2011	2021

Sources: Croatian Bureau of Statistics publications

== Administration ==
The current municipal mayor of Bednja is Damir Poljak (HDZ) and the Bednja Municipal Council consists of 13 seats.

Groups	Councilors per group
HDZ	10 / 13
Grouping of electors	3 / 13

== Culture ==
- KUD Josip Genc Bednja

== Education ==
- OŠ Franje Serta, elementary school

== Sport ==
NK Trakošćan Bednja is a local football club. Notable football players from Bednja are Andrej Kramarić and Robert Murić.

== Bibliography ==
- Jagić, Suzana (2009-11-10). "Povijesne okolnosti osnutka pučkih škola u Višnjici, Ivancu, Maruševcu i Bednji 1839. godine" [The Historical Circumstances Surrounding the Foundation of Elementary Schools in Višnjica, Maruševec and Bednja in the Year 1839]. Kaj: časopis za književnost, umjetnost, kulturu (in Croatian). 42 (4–5): 115–126. eISSN 1848-7920.
