= Zgornje Gruškovje =

- Location in Slovenia
- Coordinates: 46°17′26.03″N 15°52′39.02″E
- Country: Slovenia
- Traditional region: Styria
- Statistical region: Drava
- Municipality: Podlehnik

Area
  - Total: 6.7 km^{2} (2.6 sq mi)
- Elevation: 479.1 m (1,572 ft)

Population (2002)
  - Total: 117

Zgornje Gruškovje (pronounced [ˈzɡoːɾnjɛ ˈɡɾuːʃkɔu̯jɛ]) is a settlement in the Haloze Hills in the Municipality of Podlehnik in eastern Slovenia, close to the border with Croatia. The area is part of the traditional region of Styria. It is now included in the Drava Statistical Region.

The Croatian settlement across the border from Zgornje Gruškovje is Macelj.
