= Rinkovec =

- Village
- Location of Rinkovec in Croatia
- Coordinates: 46°13′01″N 16°0′22″E
- Country: Croatia
- County: Varaždin County
- Municipality: Bednja

Area
  - Total: 2.0 km^{2} (0.77 sq mi)

Population (2021)
  - Total: 264
  - Density: 130/km^{2} (340/sq mi)
- Time zone: UTC+1 (CET)
  - Summer (DST): UTC+2 (CEST)
- Postal code: 42253 Bednja
- Area code: +385 (0)42

Rinkovec is a village in Croatia. It is connected by the D74 highway.
