= Pleš, Croatia =

Pleš
- Village
- Location of Pleš in Croatia
- Coordinates: 46°15′N 15°59′E
- Country: Croatia
- County: Varaždin County
- Municipality: Bednja

Area
  - Total: 4.1 km^{2} (1.6 sq mi)

Population (2021)
  - Total: 240
  - Density: 59/km^{2} (150/sq mi)
- Time zone: UTC+1 (CET)
  - Summer (DST): UTC+2 (CEST)
- Postal code: 42253 Bednja
- Area code: +385 (0)42

Pleš is a village in Croatia.
