= Donji Macelj =

Settlement in Krapina-Zagorje County, Croatia

- Settlement
- Interactive map of Donji Macelj
- Location of Donji Macelj in Croatia
- Coordinates: 46°13′23″N 15°50′42″E
- Country: Croatia
- County: Krapina-Zagorje
- Municipality: Đurmanec

Area
  - Total: 16.2 km^{2} (6.3 sq mi)

Population (2021)
  - Total: 528
  - Density: 32.6/km^{2} (84.4/sq mi)
- Time zone: UTC+1 (CET)
  - Summer (DST): UTC+2 (CEST)
- Postal code: 49225 Đurmanec
- Area code: +385 (0)49

Donji Macelj is a settlement in the Municipality of Đurmanec in Croatia. It is on the Croatian border with Slovenia. In 2021, its population was 528.

== Demographics ==
Donji Macelj: Population trends 1857–2021
v

population	457	534	562	523	563	617	590	870	794	413	453	521	545	583	558	566	528
	1857	1869	1880	1890	1900	1910	1921	1931	1948	1953	1961	1971	1981	1991	2001	2011	2021

Sources: Croatian Bureau of Statistics publications
