= Gornji Macelj =

Settlement in Krapina-Zagorje County, Croatia

- Settlement
- Interactive map of Gornji Macelj
- Location of Gornji Macelj in Croatia
- Coordinates: 46°15′47″N 15°51′22″E
- Country: Croatia
- County: Krapina-Zagorje
- Municipality: Đurmanec

Area
  - Total: 12.7 km^{2} (4.9 sq mi)

Population (2021)
  - Total: 161
  - Density: 12.7/km^{2} (32.8/sq mi)
- Time zone: UTC+1 (CET)
  - Summer (DST): UTC+2 (CEST)
- Postal code: 49225 Đurmanec
- Area code: +385 (0)49

Gornji Macelj is a settlement in the Municipality of Đurmanec in northern Croatia. It is located close to Croatia's border with Slovenia. In 2021, its population was 161.

== Demographics ==
Gornji Macelj: Population trends 1857–2021
v

population					124	167	172	97		416	410	382	329	307	259	204	161
	1857	1869	1880	1890	1900	1910	1921	1931	1948	1953	1961	1971	1981	1991	2001	2011	2021

Sources: Croatian Bureau of Statistics publications
