= Trakošćan, Varaždin County =

Settlement in Varaždin County, Croatia

Trakošćan
- Settlement
- Interactive map of Trakošćan
- Location of Trakošćan in Croatia
- Coordinates: 46°15′29″N 15°56′49″E
- Country: Croatia
- County: Varaždin County
- Municipality: Bednja

Area
  - Total: 4.3 km^{2} (1.7 sq mi)

Population (2021)
  - Total: 19
  - Density: 4.4/km^{2} (11/sq mi)
- Time zone: UTC+1 (CET)
  - Summer (DST): UTC+2 (CEST)
- Postal code: 42250 Lepoglava
- Area code: +385 (0)42

Trakošćan is a settlement in the Municipality of Bednja in Croatia. In 2021, its population was 19.

== Demographics ==
Trakošćan: Population trends 1857–2021
v

population	27	54	53	65	66	44	42	29	20	25	17	25	24	30	21	18	19
	1857	1869	1880	1890	1900	1910	1921	1931	1948	1953	1961	1971	1981	1991	2001	2011	2021

Sources: Croatian Bureau of Statistics publications
