= Đurmanec =

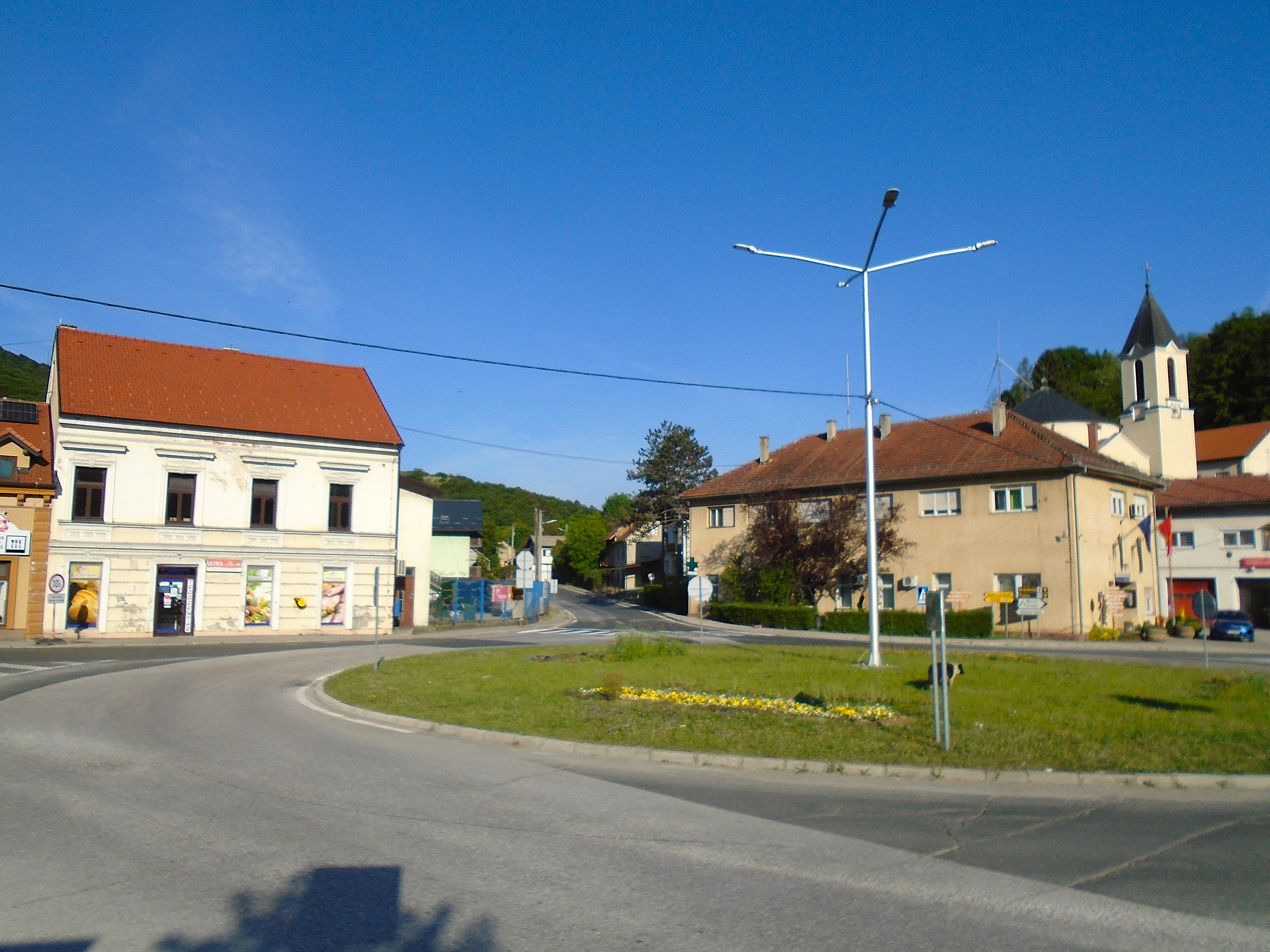
- Village centre

- Location within Croatia
- Coordinates: 46°12′0″N 15°50′24″E
- Country: Croatia
- County: Krapina-Zagorje County

Government
  - Mayor: Damir Belošević (HDZ)

Area
  - Total: 57.8 km^{2} (22.3 sq mi)

Population (2021)
  - Total: 3,781
  - Density: 65.4/km^{2} (169/sq mi)
- Time zone: UTC+1 (CET)
  - Summer (DST): UTC+2 (CEST)
- Website: djurmanec.hr

Đurmanec is a village and a municipality in the Krapina-Zagorje County in Croatia.

== History ==
The first written mention of the town of Đurmanec dates back to 1598 when it was mentioned under the name Gurmanec. At that time, the Krapina manor was divided into three large rural municipalities, one of which was Đurmanec.

The education system in Đurmanec began to operate in an organized manner in 1876 with the construction of a school building. The first teacher was Marko Petek, and in the first school year 73 students were enrolled. Classes were held regularly until 1943, when they were interrupted due to the entry of the German army into Đurmanec. There were no classes for two full years, and in 1944 the school building was burned down, but all student documentation was preserved thanks to teacher Zlatko Peček. Regular classes continued in 1945 in three wooden barracks, and in 1948 classes began in a new school building.

The first decree establishing the parish of St. George in Đurmanac was issued by Cardinal Alojzije Stepinac in 1945, when the parish was to be proclaimed and opened. However, in the meantime, Cardinal Stepinac was arrested and imprisoned, so the decree was not implemented.

The current municipality of Đurmanec was formed on April 21, 1993. The first mayor was Edo Belošević, and the first president of the Municipal Council was Zdravko Cesarec.

== Demographics ==
In the 2021 census, there were a total of 3,781 inhabitants in the area, in the following settlements:

- Donji Macelj, population 528
- Đurmanec, population 786
- Goričanovec, population 210
- Gornji Macelj, population 161
- Hlevnica, population 227
- Hromec, population 375
- Jezerišće, population 91
- Koprivnica Zagorska, population 101
- Lukovčak, population 206
- Podbrezovica, population 251
- Prigorje, population 284
- Putkovec, population 208
- Ravninsko, population 353

In the same census, an absolute majority of the population were Croats at 98.73%.

Đurmanec: Population trends 1857–2021
v

population	2966	3242	3686	3916	4424	4879	4775	5474	5281	5340	5113	5182	4883	4759	4481	4235	3781
	1857	1869	1880	1890	1900	1910	1921	1931	1948	1953	1961	1971	1981	1991	2001	2011	2021

Sources: Croatian Bureau of Statistics publications

== Administration ==
The current mayor of Đurmanec is Damir Belošević (HDZ) and the Đurmanec Municipal Council consists of 13 seats.

Groups	Councilors per group
HDZ-HSU	9 / 13
SDP	4 / 13
