= Macelj =

Human settlement in Krapina-Zagorje Country, Croatia

Coordinates: 46°16′N 15°51′E

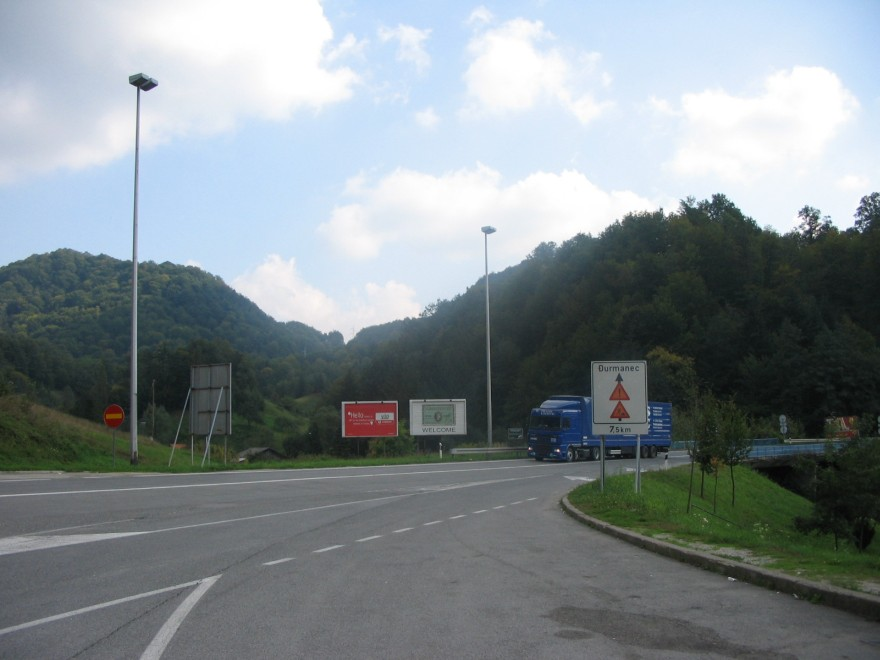
Slovenian–Croatian border near Macelj

Macelj (pronounced [mât͡sɛʎ]) is a location in northern Croatia bordering on Slovenia, encompassing a hilly forest and several villages. There is an official border crossing in Macelj, and the end of the A2 highway. The villages are administratively divided into Gornji Macelj (Upper), population 204, and Donji Macelj (Lower), population 566.

Macelj has the most frequently congested border crossing in Croatia on the Slovenian border. The Slovenian village opposite Macelj is Zgornje Gruškovje.

== History ==
At the Slavonian Sabor of June 1600 in Krapina, the poor condition of the roads through Macelj was noted, making it difficult to resupply the borders of the Kingdom of Slavonia during the Long War. So the entire Varaždin County, from each of its five gates, was obliged to send one worker each to help repair the roads to the lords of the castles of Krapina and Kostel, by order of Ban Ivan Drašković.

At the end of World War II in 1945, the forests near Macelj were the location of the Macelj massacre that took place during the Yugoslav death march of collaborators repatriated at Bleiburg.

== See also ==
- List of caves on Macelj

== Bibliography ==
=== Botany ===
- Ernoić, Milenko; Vincek, Dragutin (2022-12-28). "Agrobiološka raznolikost na širem području Parka prirode Ivanščica, Strahinjščica, Maceljska i Ravna gora u funkciji održivosti parka prirode i ruralnog razvoja" [Agricultural Biodiversity in the Wider Area of the Nature Park in the Function of the Nature Park Sustainability and Rural Development]. Radovi Zavoda za znanstveni rad Varaždin (in Croatian) (33): 169–178. doi:10.21857/m16wjcn7x9. ISSN 1848-7890.
- Hruševar, Dario; Siladi, Petra; Justić, Marta; Mitić, Božena (2018-12-31). "Vascular Flora of a Part of the Planned Hrvatsko Zagorje Regional Park (Northwestern Croatia)". Natura Croatica. 27 (2): 271–292. doi:10.20302/NC.2018.27.17. eISSN 1848-7386.
- Trinajstić, Ivo; Cerovečki, Zdravko (2009-06-30). "Festuco drymeiae-Fagetum Magic 1978 Association (Aremonio-Fagion) in the Vegetation of Northwest of Croatia". Šumarski list. 133 (5–6): 249–256. eISSN 0373-1332.

=== Geology ===
- Lozić, Sanja; Fuerst-Bjeliš, Borna; Perica, Dražen (2006-06-01). "Quantitative-geomorphological and Environmental-historical Impact of the Ecological Soil Depth; Northwestern Croatia". Hrvatski geografski glasnik. 68 (1): 7–25. doi:10.21861/HGG.2006.68.01.01. eISSN 1848-6401.

=== History ===
- Duić, Marin; Rukavina, Marko; Obad Šćitaroci, Mladen (2022-12-28). "Plemićki gradovi (burgovi) na području planiranog Parka prirode Ivanščica, Strahinjščica, Maceljska gora i Ravna gora: Prostorne mogućnosti očuvanja i unaprjeđenja" [Medieval Castles (Burgs) in the Area of the Planned Nature Park Ivanščica, Strahinjščica, Maceljska Gora and Ravna Gora: Spatial Possibilities of Preservation and Enhancement]. Radovi Zavoda za znanstveni rad Varaždin (in Croatian) (33): 147–167. doi:10.21857/ydkx2copn9. ISSN 1848-7890.

=== Zoology ===
- Koren, Toni; Lauš, Boris; Šašić, Martina; Mihoci, Iva; Štih, Ana; Bralić, Petra; Gomboc, Stanislav (2017-12-31). "Contribution to the Knowledge of the Butterfly Fauna (Lepidoptera: Papilionoidea) of Hrvatsko Zagorje, Croatia". Natura Croatica: Periodicum Musei Historiae Naturalis Croatici. 26 (2): 167–196. doi:10.20302/NC.2017.26.15. eISSN 1848-7386.
- Šašić, Martina; Nahirnić, Ana; Tarmann, Gerhard M. (2016-12-31). "Zygaenidae (Lepidoptera) in the Lepidoptera collections of the Croatian Natural History Museum". Natura Croatica: Periodicum Musei Historiae Naturalis Croatici. 25 (2): 233–248. doi:10.20302/NC.2016.25.19. eISSN 1848-7386.
