= List of E-roads in Bosnia and Herzegovina =

European routes in Bosnia and Herzegovina

System information
- Maintained by JP Autoceste FBiH; JP Autoputevi RS; JP Ceste Federation BiH; JP Putevi RS
- Length: 1,135 km (705 mi)

Highway names
- European routes: European route E nn (E nn)

System links
- Transport in Bosnia and Herzegovina

This is a list of the European Routes, or E-road highways, that run through the Bosnia and Herzegovina. The current network is signposted according to the 2016 system revision, and contains seven Class A roads and three Class B roads within the country.

Most of the roads are motorways that also carry various national A-numbers (for Autocesta), and there are several state roads with M-numbers (for Magistralna cesta).

== Class-A European routes ==
Number	Length	Northern or western terminus	Southern or eastern terminus	Route
E65	9 km (5.6 mi)	Croatian border near Neum	Croatian border near Neum	M-2: Neum
E73	379 km (235 mi)	Croatian border near Šamac	Croatian border near Doljani	M-17: Šamac - Bilješevo A 1: Bilješevo - Vogošća M-17: Vogošća - Doljani

== Class-B European routes ==
Number	Length	Northern or western terminus	Southern or eastern terminus	Route
E661	212 km (132 mi)	Croatian border near Gradiška	M-17 (E73) in Zenica	M-16: Gradiška - Donji Vakuf M-5: Donji Vakuf - Zenica
E761	443 km (275 mi)	M-14 in Bihać	Serbian border near Vardište	M-5: Bihać - Bilješevo A 1: Bilješevo - Vogošća M-5: Vogošća - Vardište
E762	92 km (57 mi)	M-17 (E73) in Sarajevo	Montenegrin border near Hum	M-18: Sarajevo - Hum

== See also ==
- A1 (Bosnia and Herzegovina)
- Roads in Bosnia and Herzegovina
- Ministry of Communication and Traffic (Bosnia and Herzegovina)
