= Stup Interchange =

- Stupska Petlja
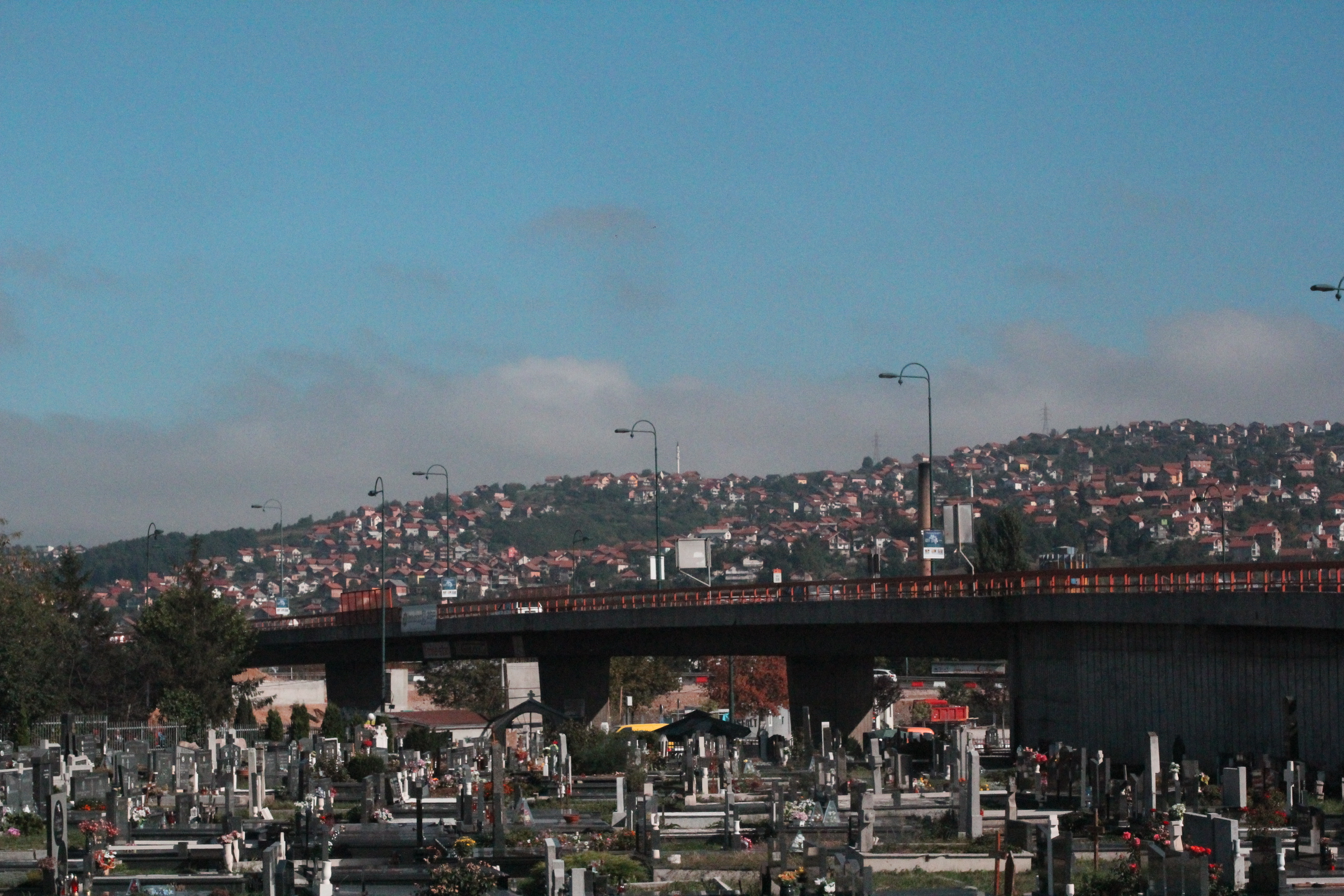
- View from south-west
- Interactive map of Stup Interchange

Location
- Sarajevo
- Coordinates: 43.8429°N 18.3288°E
- Roads at junction: M18; M17; A1 Motorway

Construction
- Type: Cloverleaf interchange
- Opened: 1978

Stup Interchange is a cloverleaf interchange in Sarajevo. It connects two different routes and some important locations in the largest city in Bosnia and Herzegovina. This interchange is the biggest interchange in the Balkans after Butila Interchange that is two miles (3.2 km) away from it. Stup Interchange connects Sarajevo International Airport with the M17 Road, the A1 Motorway, Western Sarajevo (Ilidža), Dobrinja, Boljakov Potok, the Rajlovac Industrial Zone, and the city centre.

The interchange was fully reconstructed in 2014 for €25 Million, and is one of the most frequented interchanges in the Balkans accommodating more than 60,000 vehicles each day.

In the middle of the interchange is an important and highly frequented tram station which can be accessed by using a passenger underpass with escalators.
