= Sarajevo Bypass =

Road in Bosnia and Herzegovina

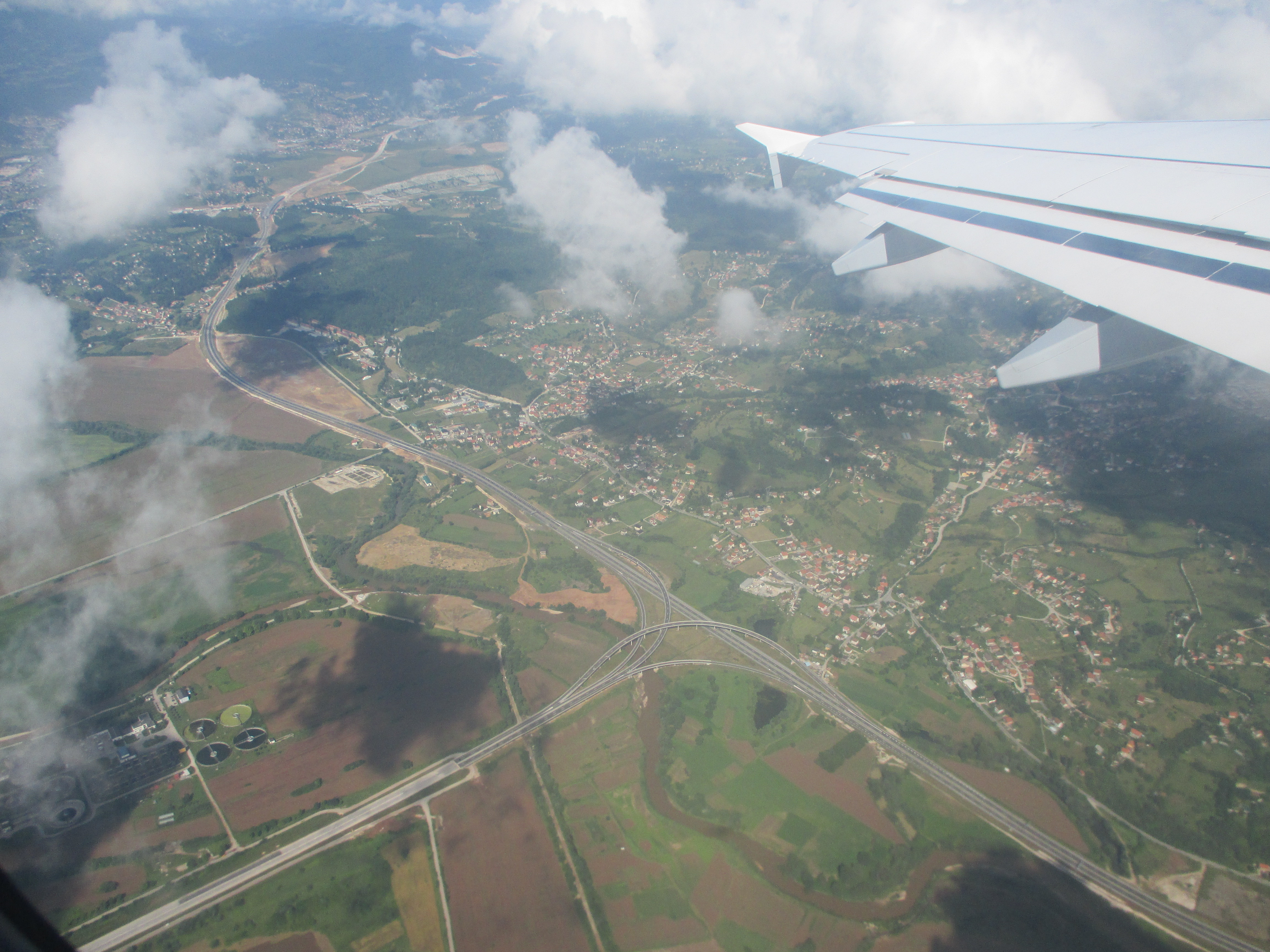
the start of the Sarajevo Bypass from the A1

Sarajevo Bypass is part of European route E73, and it connects the A1 with Sarajevska Cesta and Sarajevo International Airport.There would be 2 interchanges. One is located in XII Transversal, and other one is located on A1, and these two interchanges will be connected with exit road from A1.

== Exit list ==
Entity	km	Exit	Name	Destination	Notes
FBiH	0.0	1	Sarajevo-north	A 1 M-18	Connection to Tuzla and Sarajevo-north
FBiH	5.8	2	Butila	M-5 A 1 E761	Connection to Sarajevo and Višegrad; operating since 2015
FBiH	8.8	3	Sarajevo-west		Connection to Sarajevo-west and Sarajevo-Ilidža
1.000 mi = 1.609 km; 1.000 km = 0.621 mi: Unopened
