= Ukraine–Bosnia and Herzegovina transport visa-free regime =

2026 arrangement to liberalize freight transport between Ukraine and Bosnia and Herzegovina

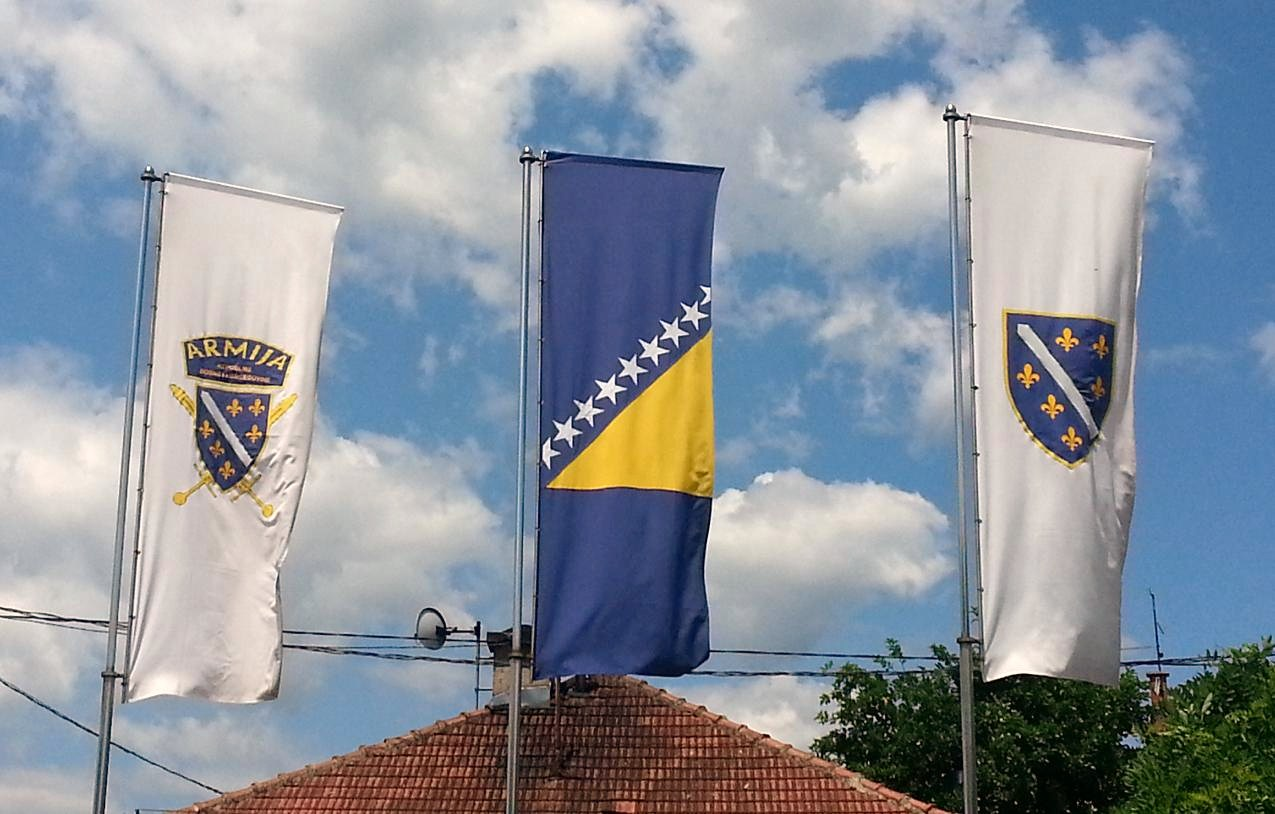
- Sarajevo, where the arrangement was agreed
- Type: Transport liberalization arrangement
- Agreement date: 12 May 2026
- Effective: 1 January 2027
- Parties: Ukraine; Bosnia and Herzegovina
- Location agreed: Sarajevo, Bosnia and Herzegovina

Ukraine–Bosnia and Herzegovina transport visa-free regime is an arrangement between Ukraine and Bosnia and Herzegovina to liberalize freight transport between the two countries. It was agreed on 12 May 2026 during the first meeting of the Joint Commission on International Road Transport in Sarajevo. From 1 January 2027, bilateral and transit freight transportation between the two countries is scheduled to operate without transport permits.

== Background ==
The arrangement was reached at the first meeting of the Joint Commission on International Road Transport between Ukraine and Bosnia and Herzegovina in Sarajevo. Before the permit-free regime begins, the two countries agreed to increase the quota of freight transport permits through the end of 2026.

== Geographical and transport context ==
Ukraine and Bosnia and Herzegovina do not share a common border, so freight transportation between the two countries involves transit through other European countries. The agreement therefore covers both bilateral and transit freight transportation, allowing carriers to operate without transport permits from 1 January 2027.

The wider European transport network provides several routes relevant to freight movements between the two countries. The European Commission's Rhine–Danube Corridor connects Ukraine with Central and southeastern Europe, while Bosnia and Herzegovina forms part of Corridor Vc, which links the country with Hungary and Croatia and continues toward the Adriatic Sea.

== Implementation ==
The permit-free regime is scheduled to begin on 1 January 2027. It will cover bilateral and transit freight transportation between Ukraine and Bosnia and Herzegovina. Until then, increased quotas for freight transport permits will apply through the end of 2026.

The Ukrainian Ministry for Development of Communities and Territories said that the liberalization would reduce the administrative burden on carriers and improve the efficiency of international logistics. It also said that trade turnover between Ukraine and Bosnia and Herzegovina had increased fivefold over the previous ten years.

The term "transport visa-free regime" refers to the removal of permit requirements for freight transport and does not refer to general visa-free travel between the two countries.

== Significance ==
According to the Ukrainian government, Bosnia and Herzegovina became the 36th country with which Ukraine had established liberalized freight transport arrangements.

== See also ==
- Bosnia and Herzegovina–Ukraine relations
- Transport in Bosnia and Herzegovina
- Transport in Ukraine
