= A1 (Federation of Bosnia and Herzegovina) =

Motorway in Bosnia and Herzegovina

A1 Motorway
- Autoput A1

Route information
- Part of
- Maintained by JP Autoceste FBiH
- Length: 160.2 km (99.5 mi) 340 km (210 mi) planned
- History: Defined: 1997; Construction started: 2001

Major junctions
- From: Donji Svilaj
- To: Zvirići

Location
- Country: Bosnia and Herzegovina
- Major cities: Odžak; Doboj (planned); Zenica; Sarajevo; Mostar (planned)

Highway system
- Transport in Bosnia and Herzegovina

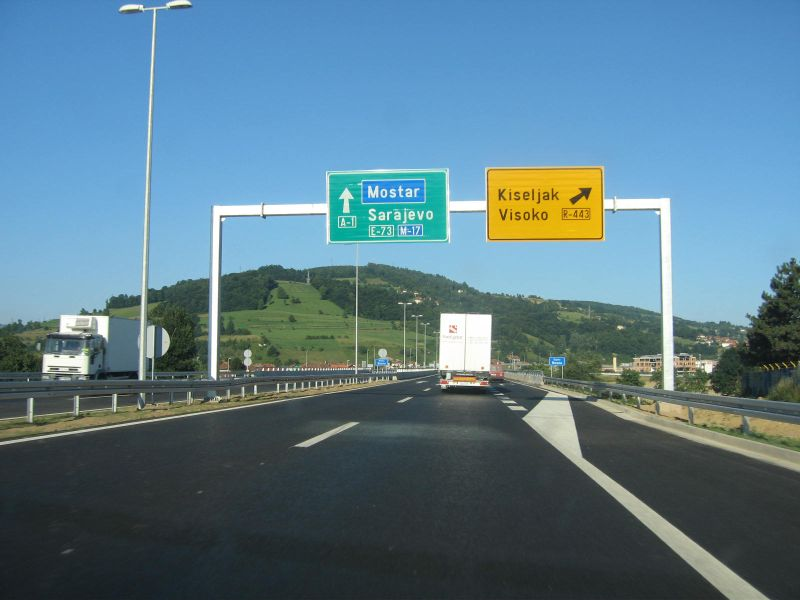
A1 near Visoko

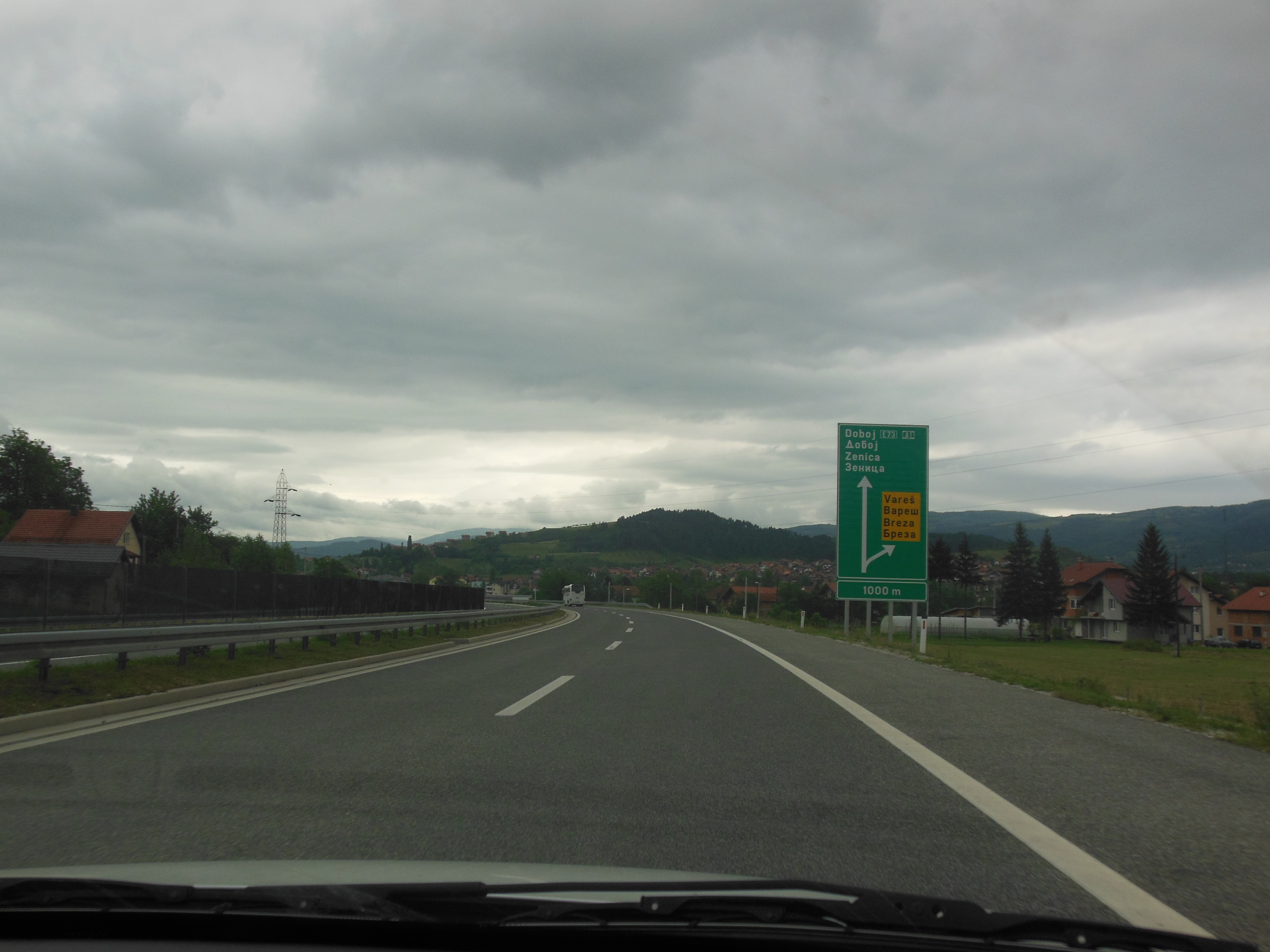
A1 near Sarajevo

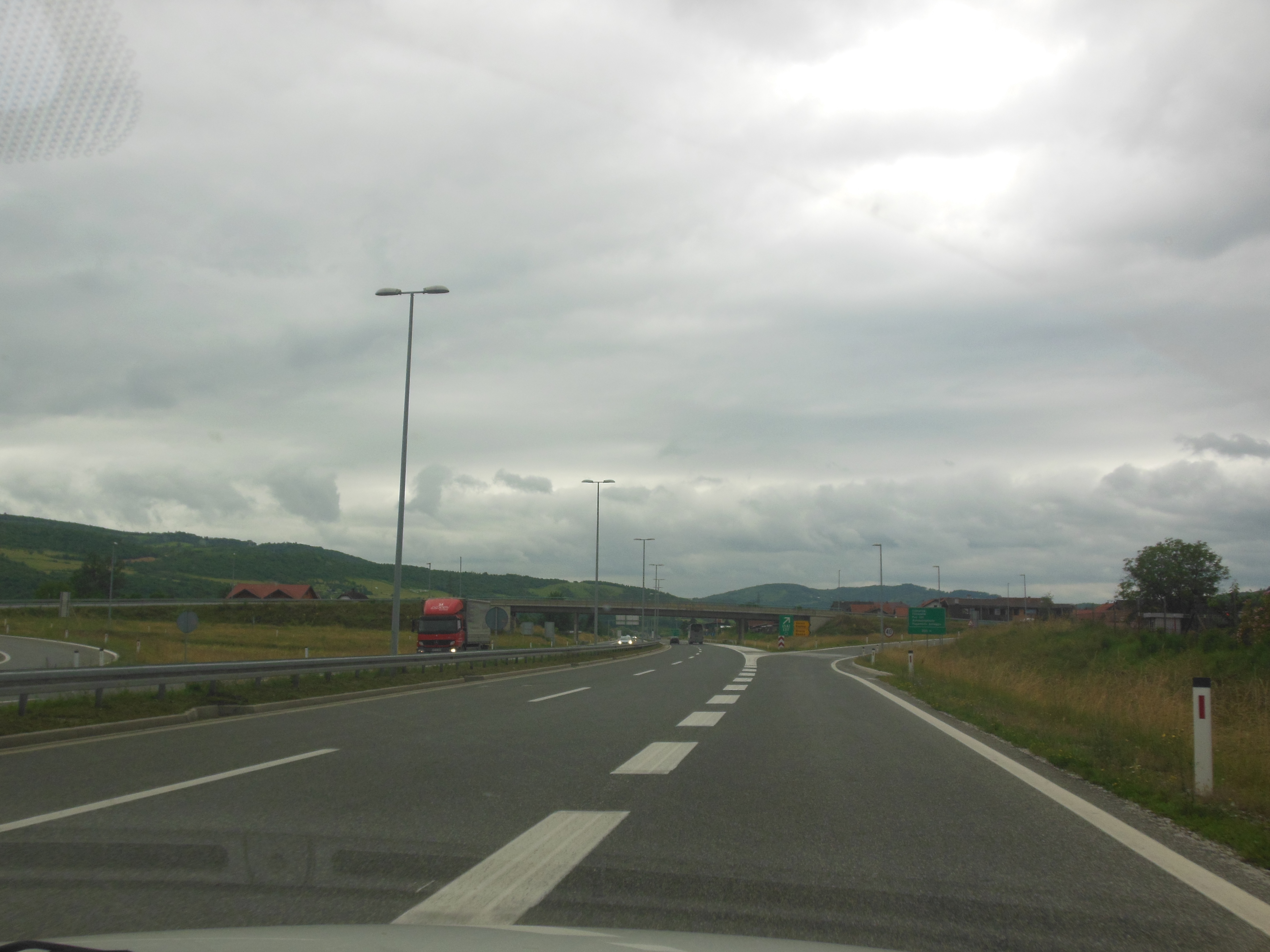
Podlugovi interchange

The A1 motorway (Bosnian: Autocesta A1, Serbian Cyrillic: Аутопут A1, romanized: Autoput A1) is a motorway in Bosnia and Herzegovina that is part of the European route E73 and, together with Croatian motorways A10 and A5, and the Hungarian M6, will provide a modern and fast road connection from Budapest to Ploče, a seaport on the Adriatic Sea. The motorway will connect the capital Sarajevo with other large cities, such as Mostar and Zenica. It will also be the main link to Bosnia and Herzegovina from the Adriatic Sea and Central Europe.

Planned in 1997, the construction, which started back in 2001, initially planned to be finished in 2015, was only 45% complete by 2026. Between 2011 and 2026, 150 kilometers were built with 190 kilometers remaining to be built. The slow pace of the A1 motorway in Bosnia and Herzegovina is attributed to financial corruption and suspended investments by EIB and OPEC, resulting in KM 5,300,000,000 (€2,711,079,850) being lost.

== Sections ==
- Section 1: Sava - Doboj
  - 64 km
- Section 2: Doboj - Sarajevo south (Tarčin)
  - 150 km
- Section 3: Sarajevo south (Tarčin) - Mostar (north)
  - 58 km
- Section 4: Mostar (north) - Croatian border
  - 68 km
    - Total: 340 km

On 20 June 2013, the 5 km section between Bijača and Kravica was opened. A new border crossing with Croatia opened on June 28.

The motorway passes near the following cities:

Odžak	Modriča	Doboj
Tešanj	Maglaj	Zavidovići
Žepče	Zenica	Kakanj
Visoko	Sarajevo	Konjic
Jablanica	Mostar	Čapljina

== Significance ==
The A1 motorway is the most important road project in Bosnia and Herzegovina. Its construction is expected to enhance economic and social activities, and will connect Bosnia and Herzegovina with the major European traffic network.

== Exit list ==
Entity	km	Exit	Name	Destination	Notes
FBiH	0.0		Svilaj border crossing	A5 / E73	Svilaj border crossing to Croatia. The road continues into Croatia as the A5 motorway towards Osijek. The northern terminus of the motorway
FBiH	1.6	1	Svilaj	M-14-1	Connection to Brod (to the west)
FBiH	3.0		Svilaj toll plaza		
FBiH	6.9		Vrbovački Lipik rest area		
FBiH	10.5	2	Odžak	M-14-1	Connection to Odžak
M-14-1 Odžak - Modriča M-17 Modriča - Johovac
RS; Designated as: A3	46.4	5	Johovac	A2	Connection to Johovac and Banja Luka of January 9th
RS; Designated as: A3	53.1	6	Kostajnica	M-I-105 M-I-105 (formerly M-17)	Connection to Doboj (to the south)
M-17 Doboj
FBiH	60.2	7	Karuše	M-4 / M-17	Connection to Doboj (to the north)
FBiH	62.9		Doboj jug toll plaza		
FBiH	67.2	8	Medakovo	R-474	Connection to Tešanj
FBiH	88.5	9	Ozimice	M-17	Connection to Žepče (to the south) (under construction)
M-17 Ozimice - Golubinja
FBiH	101.4	11	Poprikuše	M-17	Connection to Žepče (to the north)
FBiH	121.4	12	Zenica sjever	M-17	Connection to Zenica
FBiH	137.5	13	Zenica jug	M-17	Connection to Zenica
FBiH	143.4	14	Lašva	M-5 / E661 / E761	Connection to Travnik and Vitez (to the west)
FBiH	151.8	15	Kakanj	R-445	Connection to Kakanj
FBiH	153.9		Kameni Dvorac rest area		Accessible to northbound traffic only
FBiH	155.1		TE Kakanj	R-445	Connection to Kakanj Thermal Power Plant (accessible to southbound traffic only)
FBiH	168.4	16	Visoko	R-443	Connection to Visoko and Kiseljak
FBiH	170.7		Visoko rest area		Accessible to southbound traffic only
FBiH	175.8	17	Podlugovi	R-444 / R-445	Connection to Ilijaš
FBiH	186.9		Sarajevo sjever toll plaza		
FBiH	187.5	18	Sarajevo sjever	M-17 / M-18	Connection to Vogošća
FBiH	192.3	19	Butila	M-5 / M-17 / M-18 / E761	Connection to Sarajevo via BC1 expressway
FBiH	196.3	20	Sarajevo zapad	M-5 / M-17	Connection to Hadžići (to the south)
FBiH	200.2		Sarajevo zapad toll plaza		
FBiH	205.7	21	Lepenica	M-5	Connection to Kiseljak (to the north)
FBiH	208.4		Lepenica rest area		
FBiH	215.2	22	Tarčin	M-17 / R-443	Connection to Tarčin
FBiH	222.6	23	Bradina	M-17	Connection to Bradina
M-17 Bradina - Čapljina
FBiH	318.2	30	Čapljina	M-6 / M-17	Connection to Počitelj and Čapljina (to the south)
FBiH	319.7	31	Počitelj	A 4	Planned connection to Adriatic–Ionian motorway
FBiH	321.4	Hercegovina Bridge			
FBiH	328.8	32	Međugorje	M-6	Connection to Međugorje (to the north)
FBiH	334.9		Kravica rest area		
FBiH	336.5		Zvirići toll plaza		
FBiH	337.5	33	Zvirići	R-423	Connection to Ljubuški (to the north)
FBiH	340		Bijača border crossing	A10 / E73	Bijača border crossing to Croatia. The road continues into Croatia as the A10 motorway The southern terminus of the motorway.
1.000 mi = 1.609 km; 1.000 km = 0.621 mi: Incomplete access; Unopened

== Environmental concerns and criticism ==
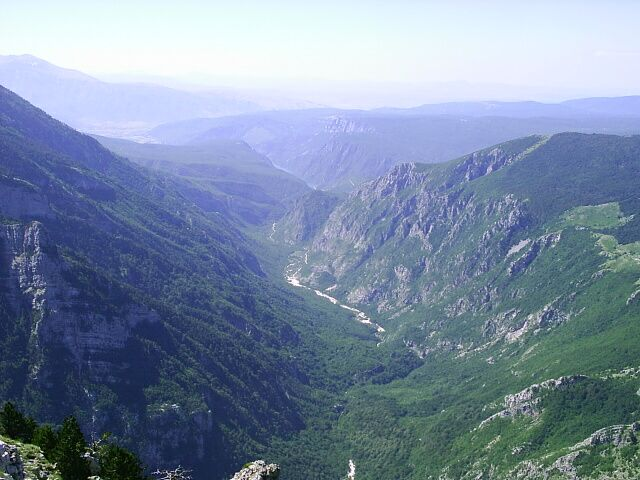
Mostarska Bijela valley in Prenj massif - controversial route of A1 Vc

Since the beginning proposed route for the A1 highway on corridor Vc was under heavy criticism from environmentalists, groups and concerned citizens, as well as some factions in academic community and media, for its encroachment on many already highly endangered natural phenomena, habitats and to significant extent on specific way of human life in traditional communities in relationship with characteristic Dinaric karst milieu and its characteristic biotope, hydrogeology and topography.

This is especially emphasized in region of Herzegovina where most of Bosnia and Herzegovina's karstic topography and biodiversity is distributed. Several particular sections are of most concern: section in vicinity of Počitelj, section passing through Blagaj, and section through massif of Prenj.

For that reason another variant of the route is proposed for every of three particular problematic sections.
