= Transport in Bosnia and Herzegovina =

Transportation networks and infrastructure in Bosnia and Herzegovina

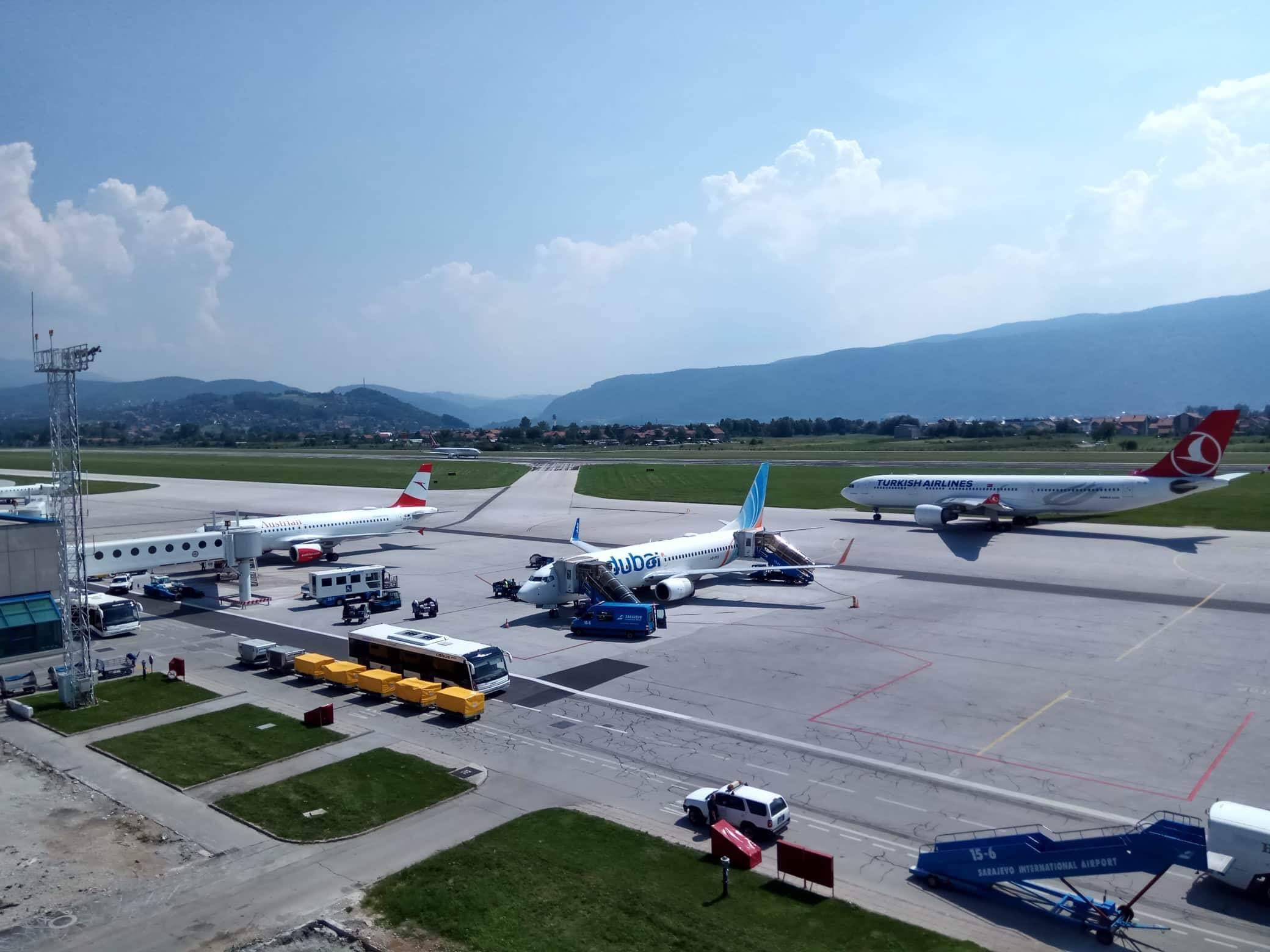
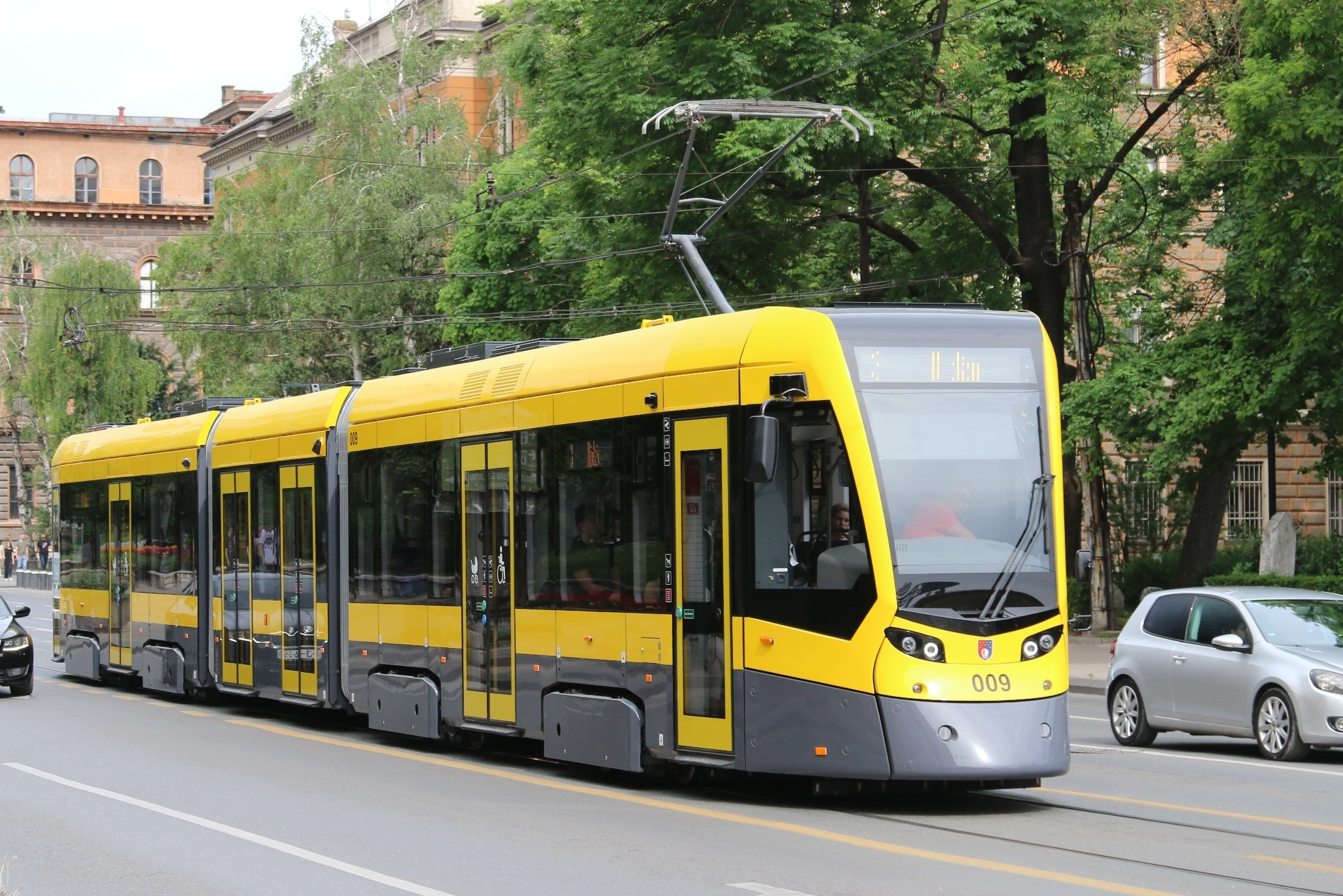
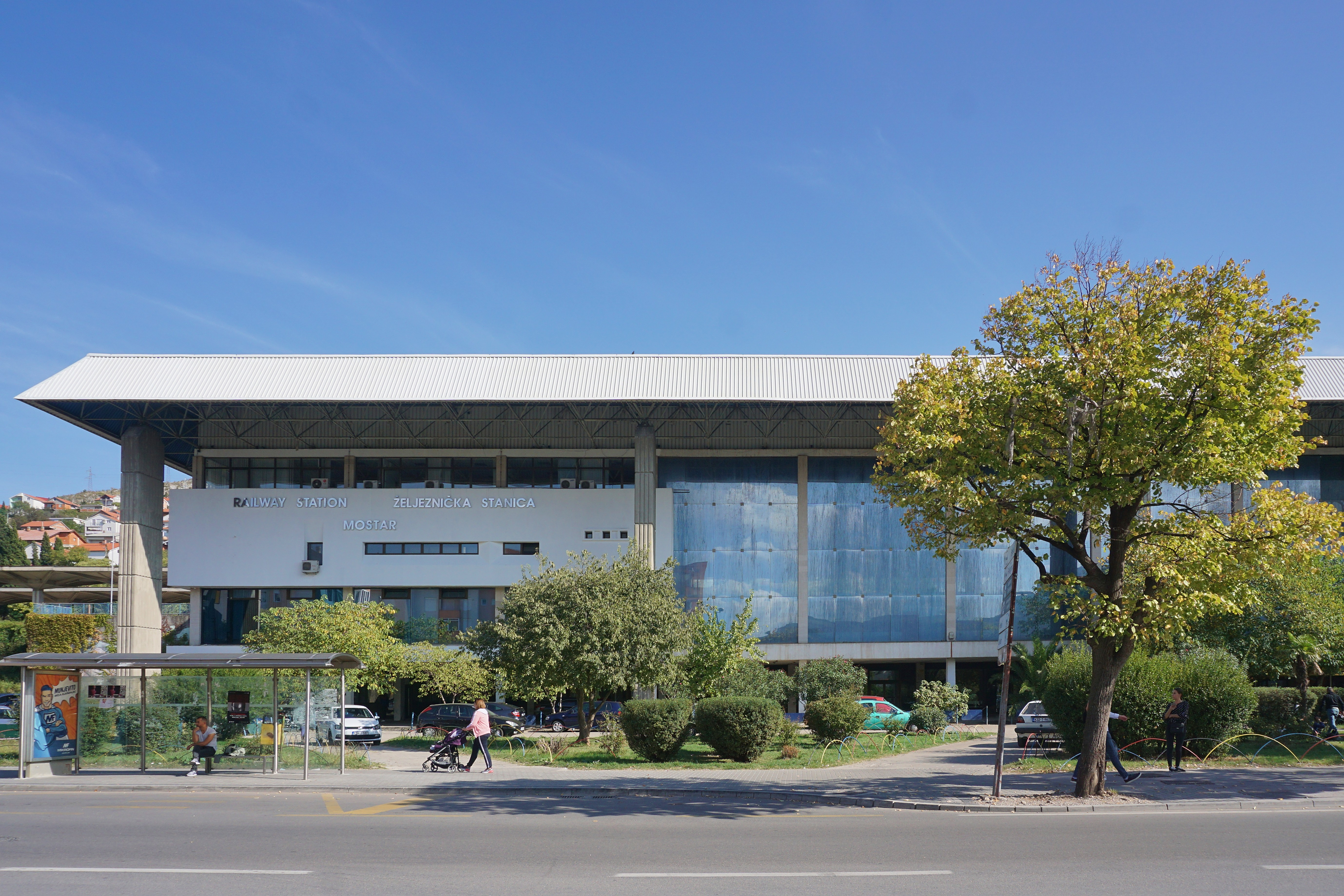
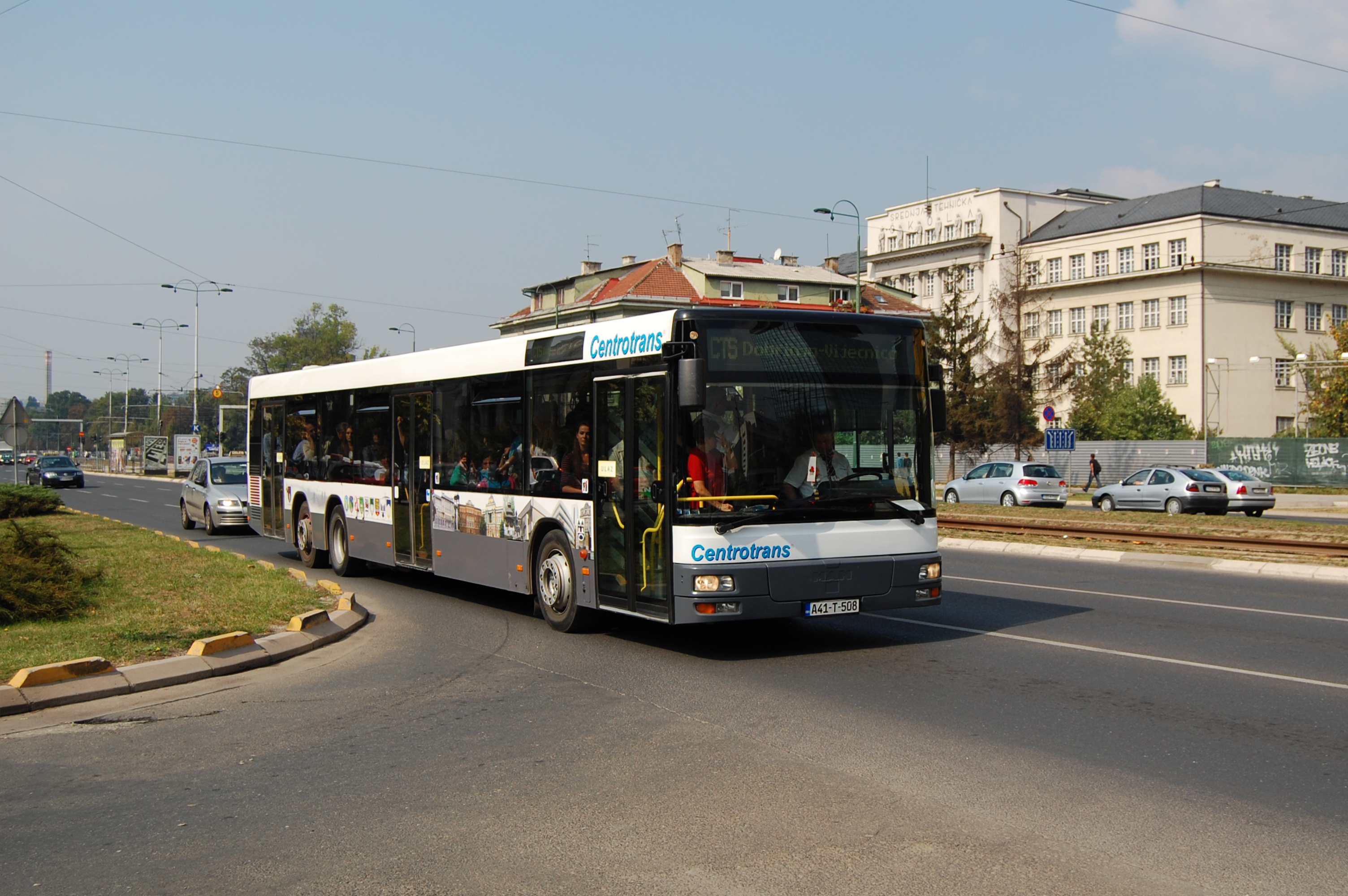
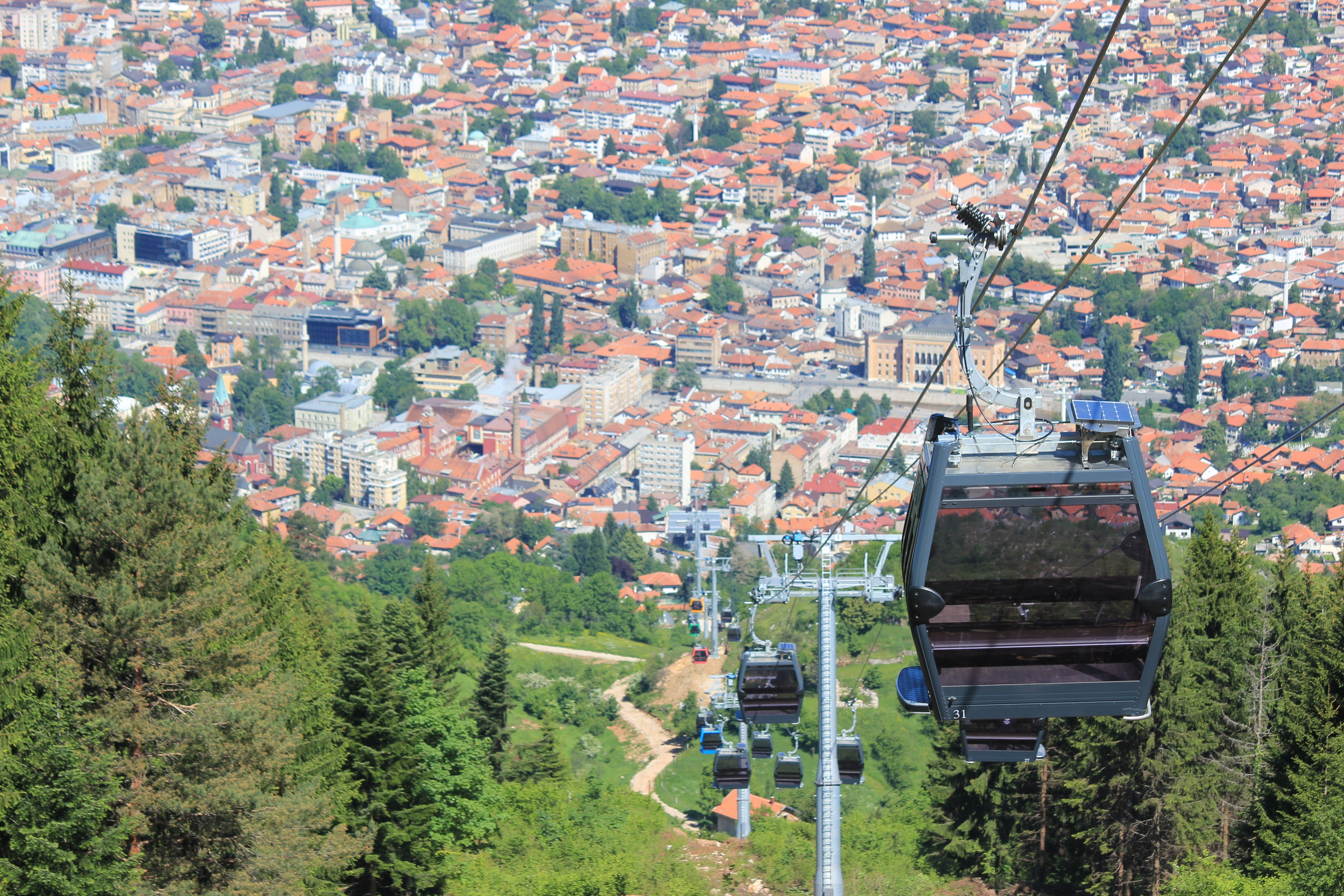
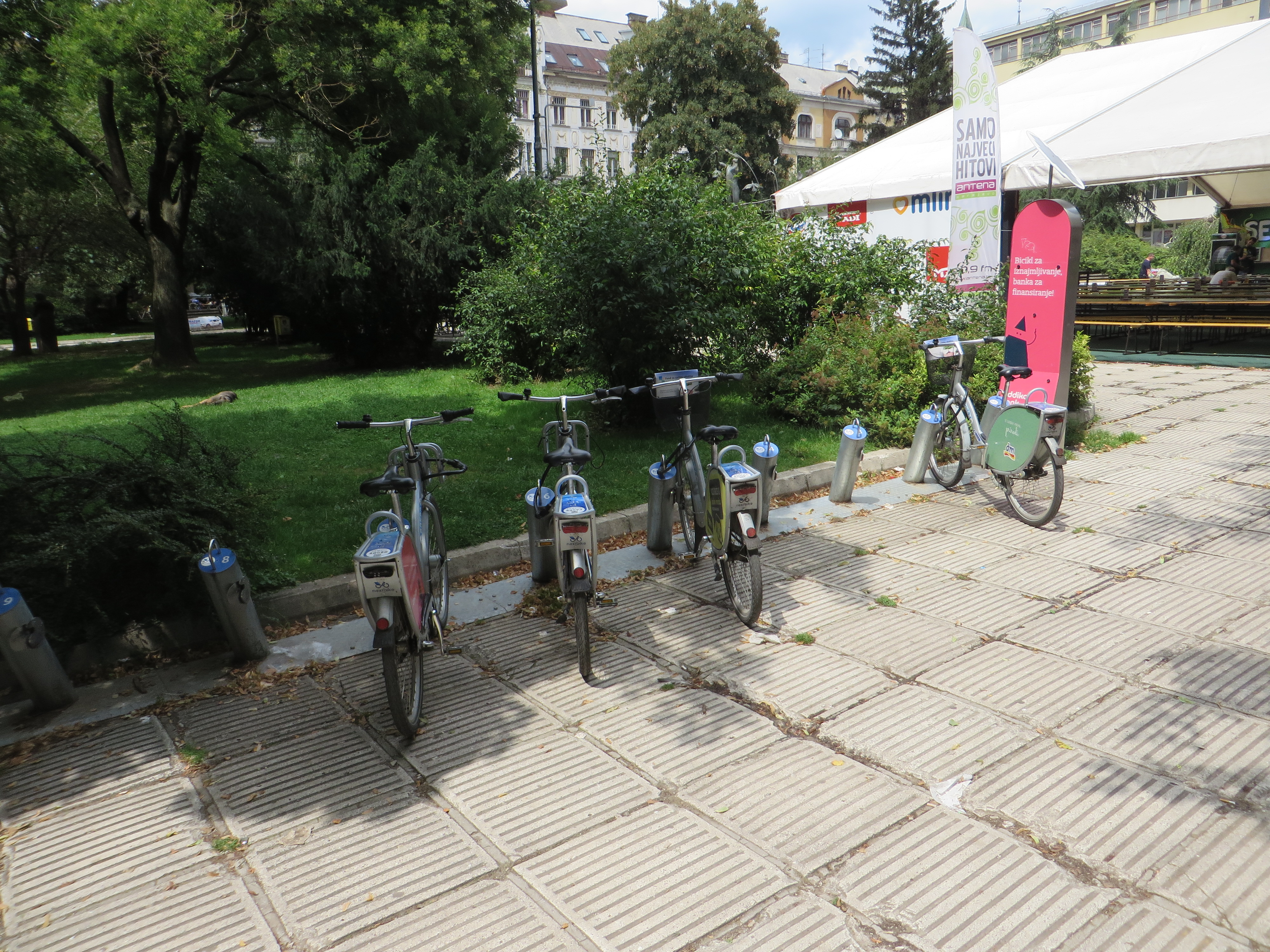
Transportation in Bosnia and Herzegovina; Sarajevo International Airport, Tram in Sarajevo, Mostar railway station, bus in Sarajevo, Sarajevo cable car, nextbike

Bosnia and Herzegovina has facilities for road, rail and air transport. There are five international road routes and 20 state highways, with bus connections to many countries. Railways total just over 1,000 km with links to Croatia and Serbia. There are 25 airports, seven of them with paved runways. The Sava River is navigable, but its use is limited.

== Roadways ==
- total: 21,846 km
  - paved: 11,425 km (4,686 km of interurban roads)
  - unpaved: 10,421 km (2006)

=== Roads ===
Roads in Bosnia and Herzegovina

==== International ====
- E65
- E73 (Pan-European corridor Vc), A1 highway
- E661
- E761
- E762

==== State highways ====
- M-1.8
- M-2
- M-4
- M-4.2
- M-5
- M-6
- M-6.1
- M-8
- M-11
- M-14
- M-14.1
- M-14.2
- M-15
- M-16
- M-16.1
- M-16.2
- M-16.3
- M-16.4
- M-17
- M-17.2
- M-17.3
- M-18
- M-19
- M-19.2
- M-19.3
- M-20

=== National and international bus services ===
Bosnia & Herzegovina is well connected to other countries in Europe. The main bus station of Sarajevo has its own website. The main provider of international bus connection in Bosnia & Herzegovina is Eurolines. There are routes to Croatia, Germany, Austria, France, Netherlands, Montenegro, Belgium, Denmark, Sweden and Serbia. Despite Bosnia & Herzegovina's geographical closeness to Serbia, there is only one bus a day, which takes more than 8 hours due to the lack of proper roads. In May 2026, Bosnia and Herzegovina and Ukraine agreed to establish the Ukraine–Bosnia and Herzegovina transport visa-free regime for bilateral and transit freight transport, beginning on 1 January 2027.

== Railways ==
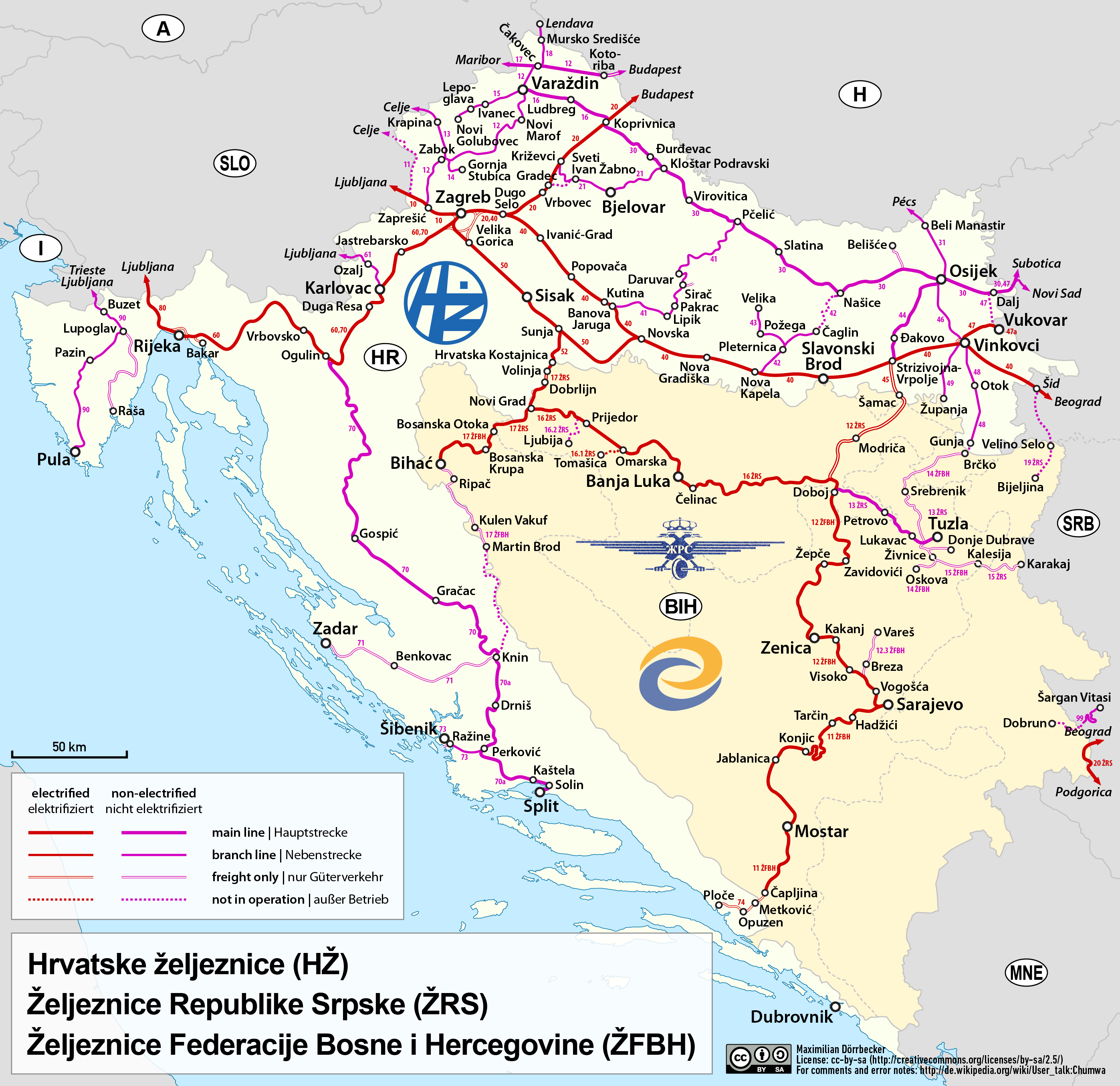
Railway network in Bosnia and Herzegovina and Croatia

- Total: 1,032 km standard gauge: 1,435 mm (4 ft 8 1/2 in) (2006)

Railway operators in Bosnia and Herzegovina are successors of the Yugoslav Railways within the country boundaries following independence from in March 1992. The two companies operating services (in their respective divisions following the Dayton Agreement) are:

- Railways of Republika Srpska (Željeznice Republike Srpske, ŽRS), which operates in Republika Srpska
- Railways of the Federation of Bosnia and Herzegovina (Željeznice Federacije Bosne i Hercegovine, ŽFBH), which operates in the Federation of Bosnia and Herzegovina.

ŽFBH and ŽRS have been members of International Union of Railways (UIC) since 1992 and 1998, respectively.

=== Rail links with adjacent countries ===
- Same gauge: 1,435 mm (4 ft 8 1/2 in)
  - Croatia — yes
  - Serbia — yes
  - Montenegro — no

== Waterways ==
Sava River (northern border) open to shipping but use is limited (2008)

=== Ports and harbours ===
Gradiška, Brod, Šamac, and Brčko (all inland waterway ports on the Sava none of which are fully operational), Orašje, Bosnia

== Airports ==
Air transport begin in Bosnia and Herzegovina during the period of the Kingdom of Yugoslavia when the flag-carrier Aeroput inaugurated a regular flight linking the national capital Belgrade with Podgorica in 1930, with a stop in Sarajevo. A year later Aeroput inaugurated another regular flight starting in Belgrade and then stopping in Sarajevo and continuing towards Split, Sušak and Zagreb. By mid-1930s Aeroput inaugurated two routes linking Belgrade and Zagreb with Dubrovnik through Sarajevo, and, in 1938, it inaugurated an international route linking Dubrovnik, which was becoming a major holiday destination, through Sarajevo, to Zagreb, Vienna, Brno and Prague.

25 (2008)

=== Airports - with paved runways ===
total: 7
2,438 to 3,047 m: 4
1,524 to 2,437 m: 1
under 914 m: 2 (2008)

=== Airports - with unpaved runways ===
total: 18
1,524 to 2,437 m: 1
914 to 1,523 m: 7
under 914 m: 10 (2008)

=== Heliports ===
6 (2013)

== See also ==
- Bosnia and Herzegovina
- Ukraine–Bosnia and Herzegovina transport visa-free regime
