= FlyBosnia =

Defunct airline from Bosnia & Herzegovina

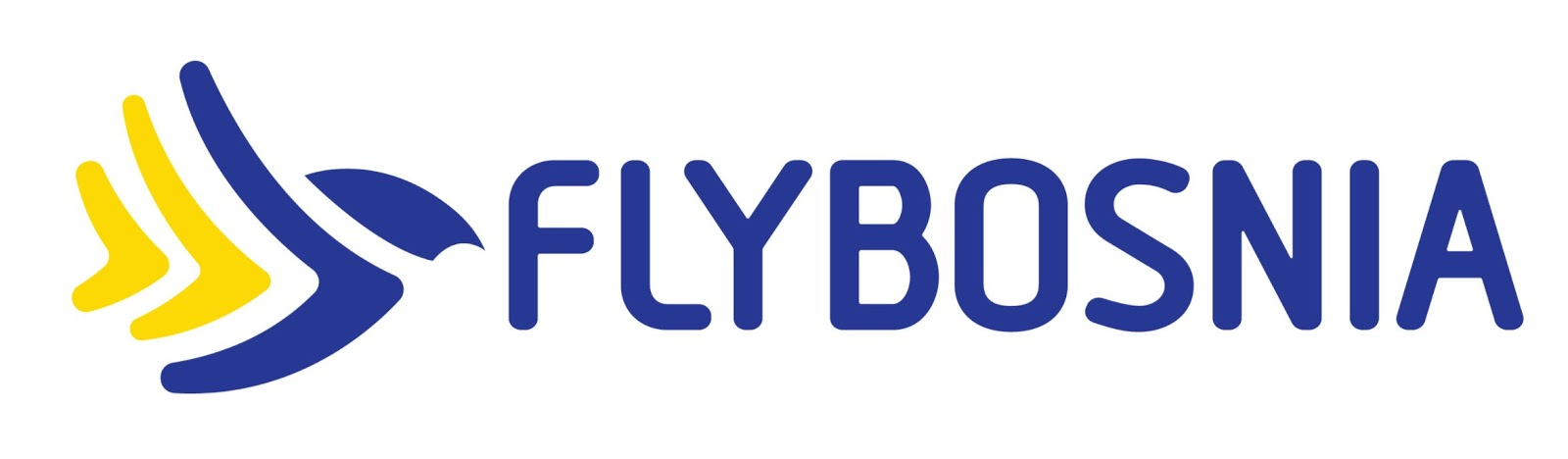

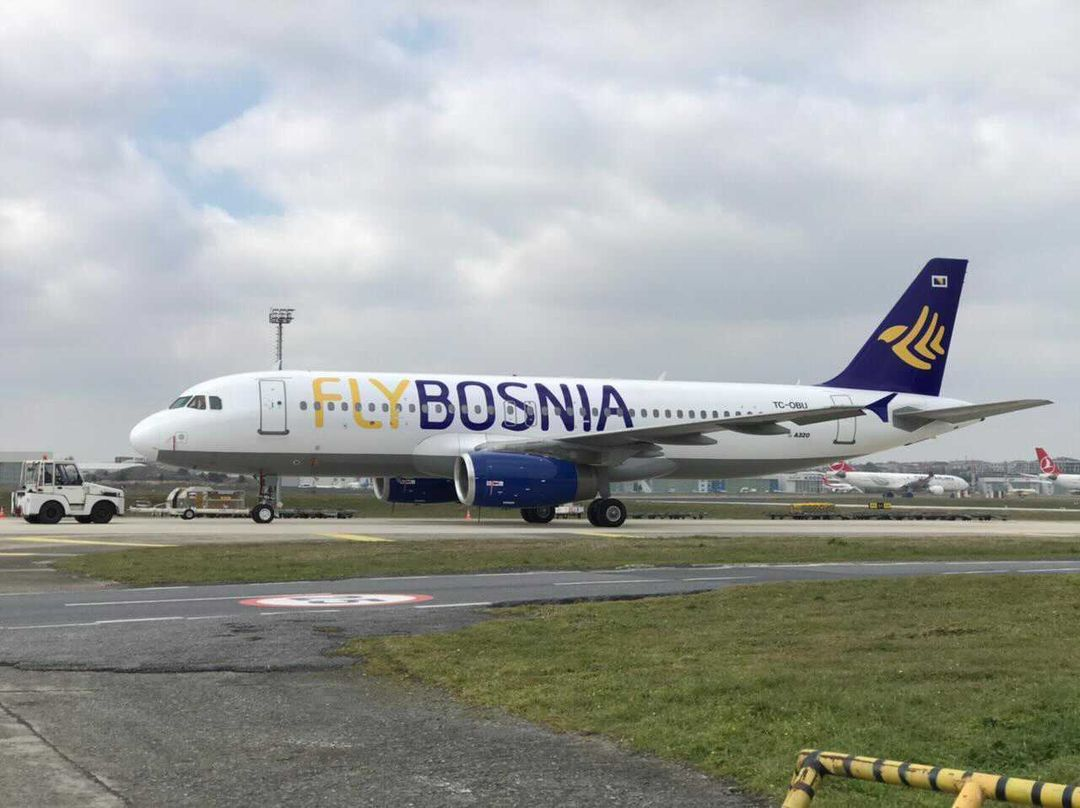
- Airbus A320-200
IATA	ICAO	Call sign
6W	FBS	BOSNIAAIR
- Founded: November 2017
- Commenced operations: January 2019
- Ceased operations: November 2020
- Hubs: Sarajevo International Airport
- Headquarters: Sarajevo, Bosnia and Herzegovina
- Website: www.flybosnia.ba

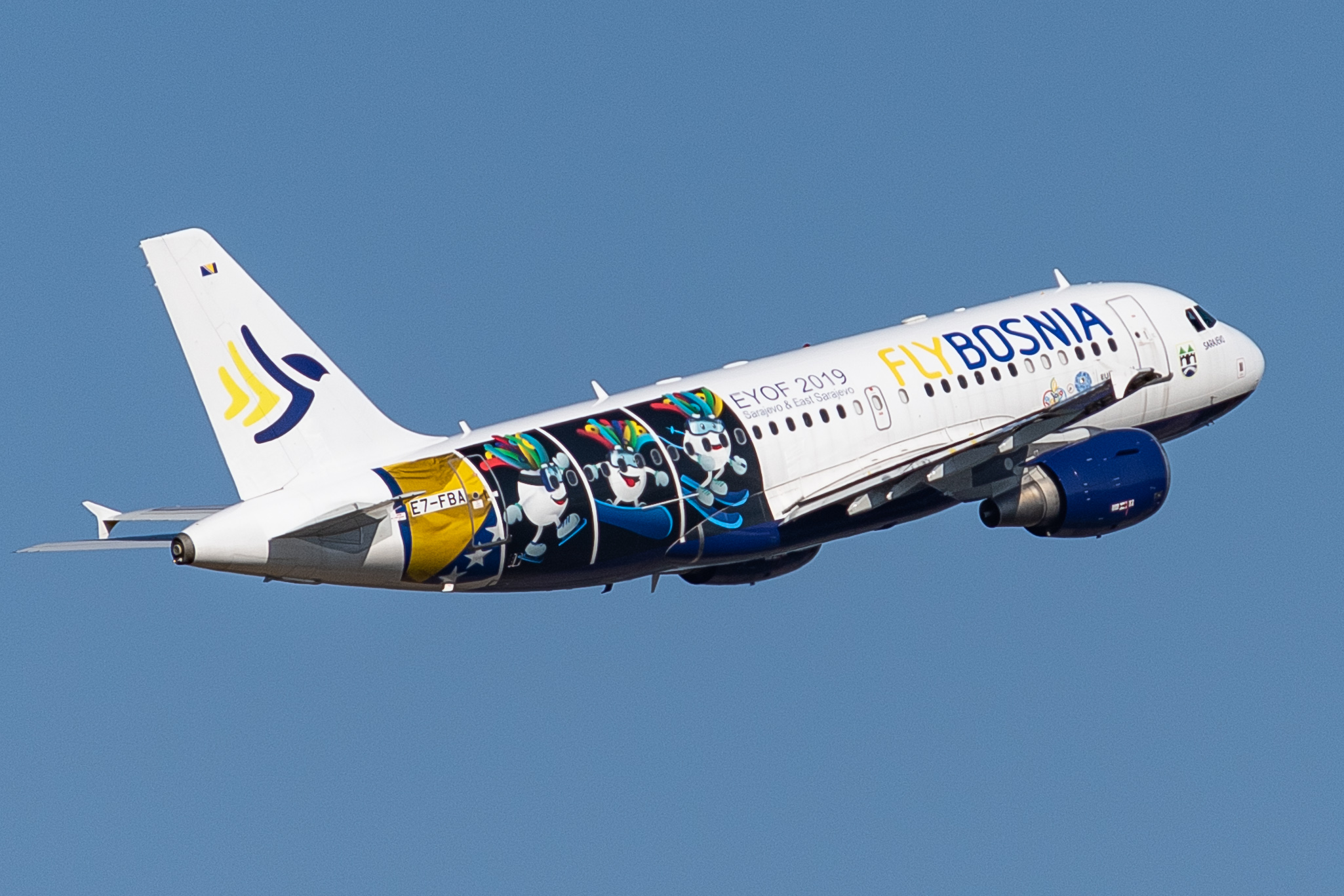
Airbus A319-100

FlyBosnia was an airline from Bosnia and Herzegovina based at Sarajevo International Airport in Sarajevo.

== History ==
FlyBosnia was registered in November 2017. The Bosnia and Herzegovina Directorate of Civil Aviation (BHDCA) issued an Air Operator Certificate (AOC) to the airline on 11 January 2019. Flying a single Airbus A319, FlyBosnia based its growth strategy on religious tourism and announced services to European operations, mainly London, Paris and Rome.

FlyBosnia's second plane, also an Airbus A319 (registration E7-FBB), arrived from the United States on 8 May 2019, delivered by Aircraft Ferry Specialists. However, the aircraft was returned to its lessor in November 2019. The airline had planned to add two more aircraft to its fleet by the end of 2019, with an additional eight to arrive by 2023. Schedules were launched in June of that same year.

In October 2019, reports emerged that FlyBosnia owed Sarajevo Airport substantial amounts of money for handling services. Shortly after, it came to light that the airline had been failing to pay wages for several months and had been forced to lay off nearly half its staff. In November 2019, the company came to an agreement with Sarajevo Airport to pay the fees. FlyBosnia also phased out one of its two Airbus A319s, with plans to take two more in 2020.

In August 2020, FlyBosnia announced the termination of all its scheduled routes, with only charter services to Kuwait and Antalya remaining. Its sole owned aircraft, an Airbus A319-100, was to be scrapped and replaced under a wet lease contract to establish a broader network of charter destinations in 2021. A new CEO was also appointed. In November 2020, FlyBosnia terminated its contract with Sarajevo Airport due to unpaid debts and financial difficulties. Following the move, the airline ended operations. In November of that same year all flight operations were halted.

In December 2021, FlyBosnia announced that it would return to the market with flights from all airports in Bosnia and Herzegovina to Zürich and Geneva in Switzerland. However, the airline confirmed that these flights were a scam, as a travel agency from Switzerland had been selling FlyBosnia tickets without their permission for 2 weeks.

As of late 2022, Sarajevo Airport released a tender to find a successor airline. In October 2022, the Bosnian authorities revoked both FlyBosnia's air operator certificate and operational license, over two years after the airline's final flight.

== Destinations ==
FlyBosnia served the following scheduled and charter destinations:

Country	City	Airports	Notes
Bahrain	Manama	Bahrain International Airport	
Bosnia and Herzegovina	Sarajevo	Sarajevo International Airport	Hub
Bosnia and Herzegovina	Mostar	Mostar International Airport	
Egypt	Hurghada	Hurghada International Airport	Seasonal charter
Kuwait	Kuwait City	Kuwait International Airport	
Saudi Arabia	Buraidah	Prince Naif bin Abdulaziz International Airport	Seasonal
Saudi Arabia	Jeddah	King Abdulaziz International Airport	
Saudi Arabia	Riyadh	King Khalid International Airport	
Tunisia	Monastir	Habib Bourguiba International Airport	Seasonal charter
Turkey	Antalya	Antalya Airport	Seasonal charter
Italy	Rome	Leonardo da Vinci-Fiumicino Airport	
United Kingdom	London	Luton Airport	

== Fleet ==
FlyBosnia's fleet had been composed of the following aircraft:

FlyBosnia fleet
Aircraft	In service	Orders	Passengers	Notes
Airbus A319-100	2	—	144	One leased from AerCap (E7-FBB)
Airbus A320-200	1	—	174	Leased from Onur Air
Airbus A321-200	1	—	153	Leased from HiFly
Total	4	—		

== Accidents and incidents ==
On 17 October 2019, FlyBosnia flight 6W108 from Rome, operated using an Airbus A319 (E7-FBB, MSN 1925), landed at Sarajevo Airport where it struck a boarding stair vehicle, damaging its left wingtip fence. The causes of the incident were determined to be the insufficient monitoring of the follow-me vehicle's movements by the flight crew while taxiing to the aircraft's parking position, and the incorrect positioning of the passenger stair vehicle on the apron.
