= Bijača =

Village in Ljubuški, Bosnia and Herzegovina

Bijača Бијача
- Village
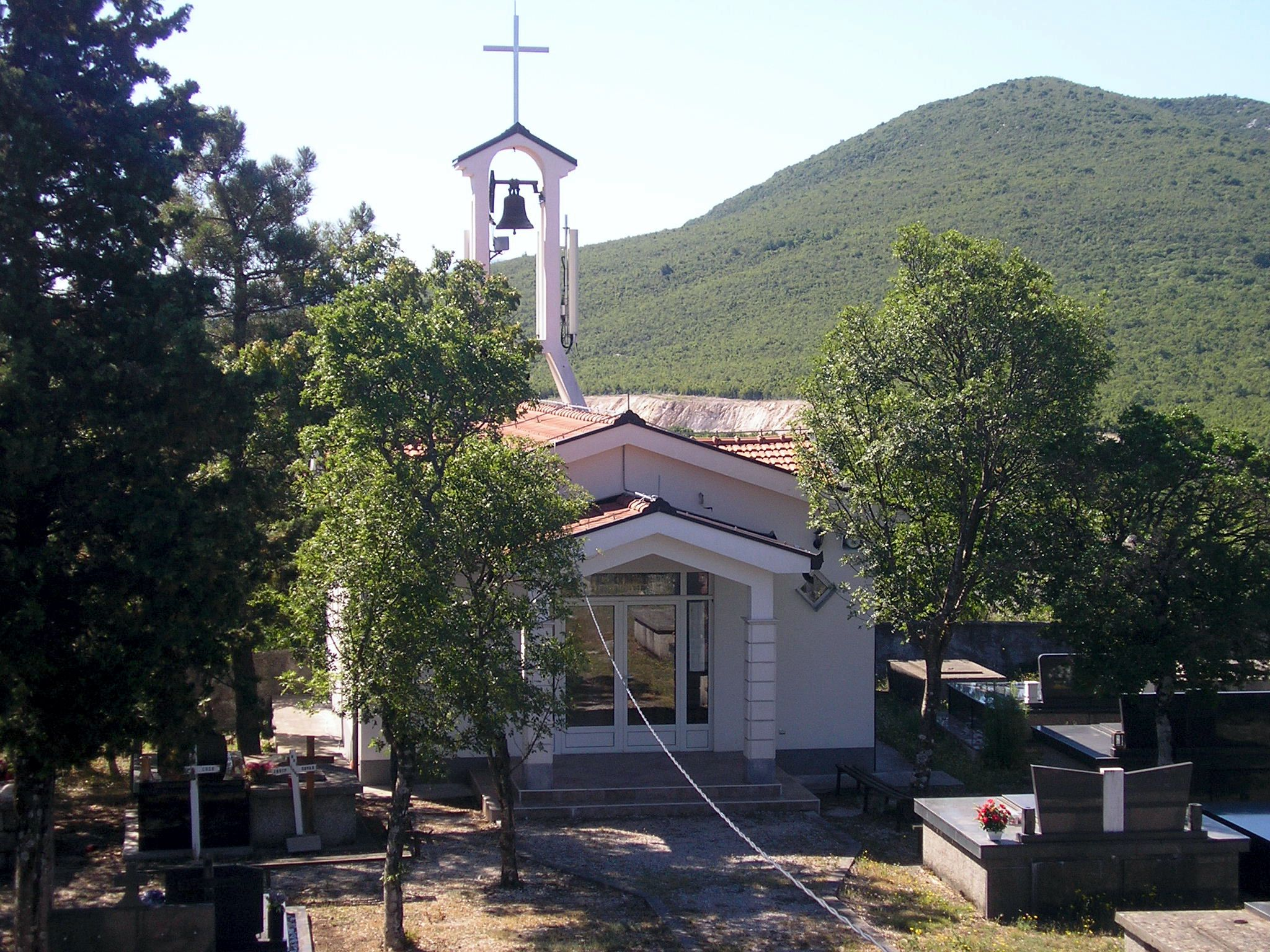
- Saint Clare church in Bijača

- Location within Bosnia and Herzegovina
- Country: Bosnia and Herzegovina
- Entity: Federation of Bosnia and Herzegovina
- Canton: West Herzegovina
- Municipality: Ljubuški

Area
  - Total: 4.50 sq mi (11.65 km^{2})

Population (2013)
  - Total: 175
  - Density: 38.9/sq mi (15.0/km^{2})
- Time zone: UTC+1 (CET)
  - Summer (DST): UTC+2 (CEST)

Bijača (Serbian Cyrillic: Бијача) is a village in Bosnia and Herzegovina. According to the 1991 census, the village is located in the municipality of Ljubuški.

== Demographics ==
According to the 2013 census, its population was 175.

Ethnicity in 2013
Ethnicity	Number	Percentage
Croats	171	97.7%
Bosniaks	4	2.3%
Total	175	100%
