= Golubinja =

- Village
- Location within Bosnia and Herzegovina
- Coordinates: 44.3855242°N 17.978053°E
- Country: Bosnia and Herzegovina
- Entity: Federation of Bosnia and Herzegovina
- Canton: Zenica-Doboj
- Municipality: Žepče

Area
  - Total: 1.92 sq mi (4.98 km^{2})

Population (2013)
  - Total: 363
  - Density: 189/sq mi (72.9/km^{2})
- Time zone: UTC+1 (CET)
  - Summer (DST): UTC+2 (CEST)

Golubinja is a village in the municipality of Žepče, Bosnia and Herzegovina.

== Demographics ==
According to the 2013 census, its population was 363.

Ethnicity in 2013
Ethnicity	Number	Percentage
Bosniaks	316	87.1%
Croats	39	10.7%
Serbs	1	0.3%
other/undeclared	7	1.9%
Total	363	100%
