= Bosnia and Herzegovina–Ukraine relations =

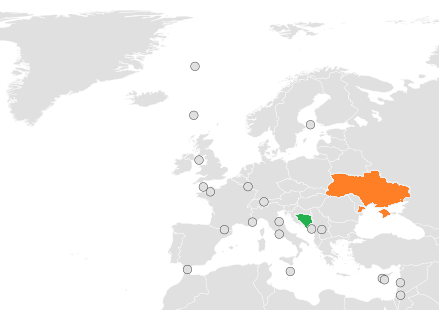

- Bosnia and Herzegovina: Ukraine

Bosnia and Herzegovina–Ukraine relations refer to the set of international bilateral relations between Bosnia and Herzegovina and Ukraine, as well as cooperation between both countries in international organizations. Both countries are full members of the Council of Europe, International Criminal Court, OSCE and the United Nations. Both countries are interested in joining the EU and NATO.

== Relations ==
Bosnia and Herzegovina recognized the state independence of Ukraine on 20 April 1992.

On 12 October 1992, the Presidium of the Verkhovna Rada of Ukraine recognized the state independence of Bosnia and Herzegovina by its resolution.

Diplomatic relations were established on 20 December 1995.

Since 17 November 2004, the Branch of the Embassy of Ukraine in the Republic of Croatia in Bosnia and Herzegovina has been operating in Sarajevo.

== Resident diplomatic missions ==
- Bosnia and Herzegovina is represented in Ukraine through its embassy in Budapest (Hungary) and an honorary consulate in Kyiv.
- Ukraine has an embassy in Sarajevo.

== See also ==
- Foreign relations of Bosnia and Herzegovina
- Foreign relations of Ukraine
- Accession of Bosnia and Herzegovina to the EU
- Accession of Ukraine to the EU
- Soviet Union–Yugoslavia relations
