= Johovac =

Coordinates: 44.6294°N 19.2047°E

Johovac Јоховац
- Village (Selo)
- Interactive map of Johovac
- Country: Bosnia and Herzegovina
- Municipality: Bijeljina
- Time zone: UTC+1 (CET)
  - Summer (DST): UTC+2 (CEST)

Johovac (Serbian Cyrillic: Јоховац) is a village in the municipality of Bijeljina, Bosnia and Herzegovina.

== Notable people ==
- Savo Milošević
