= Bilješevo =

Village in Kakanj, Bosnia and Herzegovina

Bilješevo Биљешево
- Village
- Location within Bosnia and Herzegovina
- Coordinates: 44°08′N 18°00′E
- Country: Bosnia and Herzegovina
- Entity: Federation of Bosnia and Herzegovina
- Canton: Zenica-Doboj
- Municipality: Kakanj

Area
  - Total: 1.02 sq mi (2.63 km^{2})

Population (2013)
  - Total: 132
  - Density: 130/sq mi (50.2/km^{2})
- Time zone: UTC+1 (CET)
  - Summer (DST): UTC+2 (CEST)

Bilješevo (Serbian Cyrillic: Биљешево) is a village in the municipality of Kakanj, Bosnia and Herzegovina.

== Demographics ==
According to the 2013 census, its population was 132.

Ethnicity in 2013
Ethnicity	Number	Percentage
Bosniaks	121	91.7%
Serbs	10	7.6%
Croats	1	0.8%
Total	132	100%
