= Sarajevo International Airport =

Airport in Butmir, Bosnia and Herzegovina

Sarajevo International Airport Međunarodni aerodrom Sarajevo

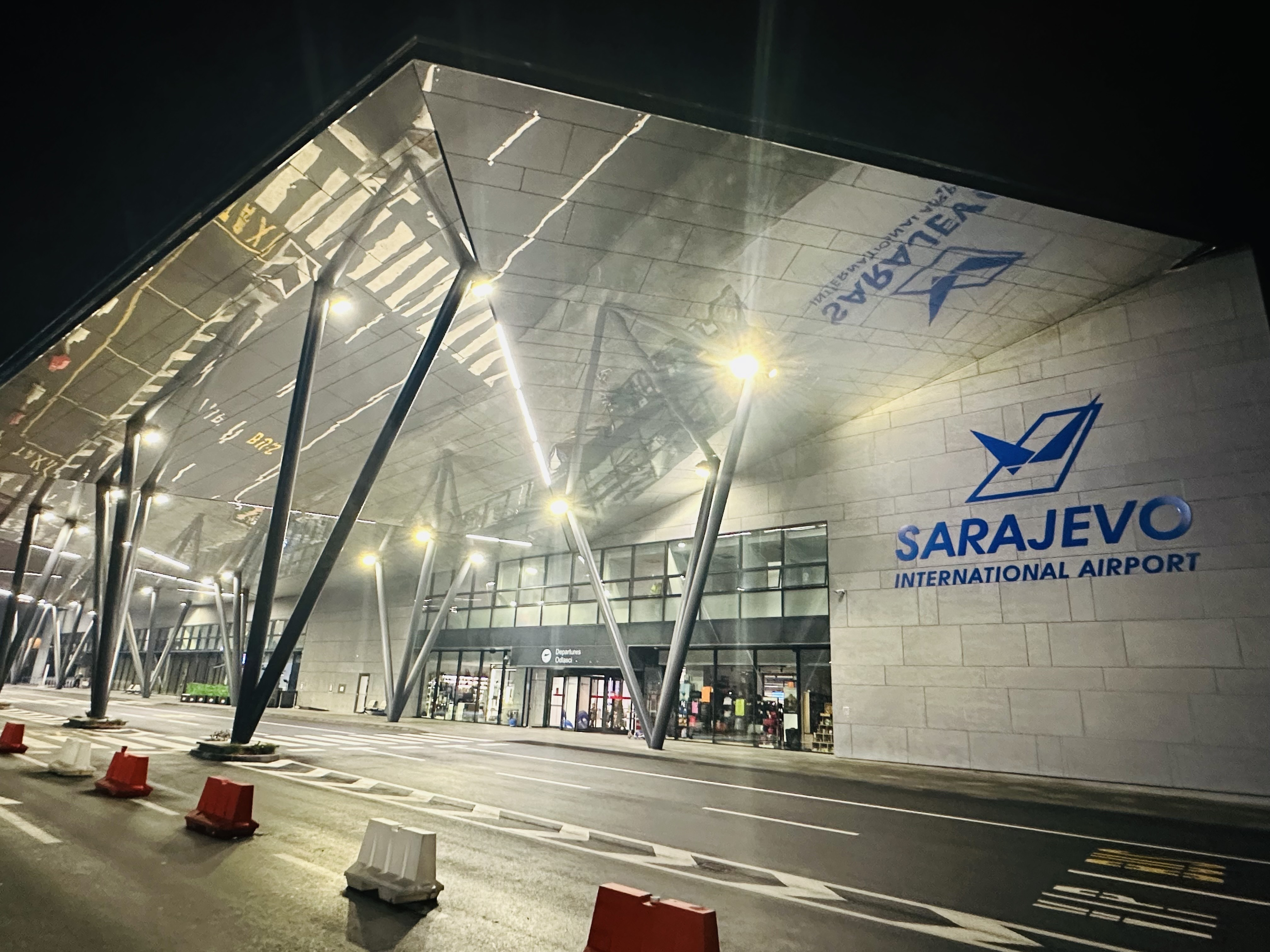
- IATA: SJJ; ICAO: LQSA

Summary
- Airport type: Public
- Operator: Bosnia and Herzegovina Directorate of Civil Aviation (BHDCA)
- Serves: Sarajevo, Bosnia and Herzegovina
- Location: Butmir
- Focus city for: Ryanair and Wizzair
- Elevation AMSL: 1,708 ft (521 m)
- Coordinates: 43°49′29″N 018°19′53″E
- Website: https://www.sarajevo-airport.ba/

Map
- Location within Bosnia and Herzegovina SJJ (Balkans) SJJ (Europe)

Runways
Direction	Length		Surface
Direction	m	ft	Surface
11/29	2,600	8,530	Asphalt

Statistics (2025)
- Passengers: 2,226,692 ▲22,2%
- Aircraft Movements: 19,671▲16,8%
- Freight (in tons): 3,344 ▲5,6%
- Source (excluding statistics): Bosnian and Herzegovinian AIP at EUROCONTROL Sarajevo Airport Statistics

PE Sarajevo International Airport
- Native name: ЈP Međunarodni Aerodrom Sarajevo
- Type: Public-owned enterprise
- Industry: Consumer services
- Founded: 2 June 1969; 57 years ago (Current form)
- Headquarters: Sarajevo, Bosnia and Herzegovina
- Area served: Bosnia and Herzegovina
- Key people: Dino Selimović (Acting director)
- Services: Airport operations
- Revenue: ▲€48.11 million (2025)
- Net income: ▲€12.43 million (2025)
- Total assets: ▲€126.37 million (2017)
- Total equity: ▲€86.00 million (2017)
- Owner: Government of the Federation of Bosnia and Herzegovina (100.00%)
- Number of employees: 484 (2016)

Sarajevo International Airport (Bosnian: Međunarodni aerodrom Sarajevo, Serbian: Међународни аеродром Сарајево, Croatian: Međunarodna zračna luka Sarajevo) (IATA: SJJ, ICAO: LQSA) is the main international airport in Bosnia and Herzegovina, serving its capital Sarajevo. It is located 3.3 NM (6.1 km; 3.8 mi) southwest of the Sarajevo railway station and some 6.5 NM (12.0 km; 7.5 mi) west of downtown Sarajevo in the Ilidža municipality, suburb of Butmir. In 2025, 2,226,692 passengers travelled through the airport, compared to 323,499 in 2001.

== History ==
=== Early years ===
First regular flights to Sarajevo using an airfield in the suburb of Butmir begin in 1930 when the domestic airline Aeroput opened a regular route linking Belgrade to Podgorica via Sarajevo. A year later, Aeroput opened a new route which linked Belgrade and Zagreb via Sarajevo, Split, and Rijeka. In 1935, Aeroput operated three times weekly the non-stop route Belgrade – Sarajevo, which was extended to Dubrovnik a year later. In 1937, Aeroput included regular flights linking Sarajevo to Zagreb, and 1938 was the year when first international flights were introduced when Aeroput extended the route Dubrovnik – Sarajevo – Zagreb to Vienna, Brno, and Prague.

At the beginning of the Bosnian War, the airport was put under control of the Yugoslav People's Army (JNA). When the regular flights were stopped, the JNA evacuated some 30,000 people, mostly women and children, who were spouses and children of JNA officers fleeing the siege of Sarajevo; the first humanitarian aid from the US and France arrived in this period too.

On 2 May 1992 Bosnian President Alija Izetbegović and his daughter flew into the airport from Lisbon, where they had been taking part in EC-mediated talks. Although guaranteed EC Protection, the airport had been seized by the JNA and they were held in the airport against their will. Their situation was made public when, that evening, a woman phoned the airport to ask for the whereabouts of her daughter and Izetbegović took the phone, proclaiming "Dear lady, this is President Izetbegović, please call the Presidency, call the TV station and tell them we are being held against our will!". Izetbegović negotiated his own release, leading to himself and his daughter being released on Dobrovoljačka Street in exchange for safe passage of an ill-fated JNA column.

After JNA left, the airport was for a while under control of Bosnian Serb forces and in June 1992, they handed over the airport to the UN to use it for humanitarian purposes (United Nations Security Council Resolution 757). In the biggest humanitarian operation in history of the UN that followed, during the Bosnian war, some 13,000 flights were carried out and over 160,000 tons of international humanitarian aid was delivered to the besieged city of Sarajevo.

The airport re-opened to civilian air traffic on 16 August 1996 and has since been renovated and slowly restored. Since the Dayton Agreement in 1995, the airport has a commercial flight business which includes Austrian Airlines, Lufthansa, Air Serbia, Croatia Airlines, Turkish Airlines, and others.

=== Development in the 2000s ===
On 18 October 2005, Paddy Ashdown, the High Representative of Bosnia and Herzegovina, suspended a decision by Bosnian authorities to name the airport after Alija Izetbegović, the first President of Bosnia and Herzegovina. The High Representative stated that such a renaming might undermine the reconciliation process by alienating non-Bosniak citizens. In 2005, the European branch of the Airports Council International awarded Sarajevo the award of Best Airport Under 1 Million Passengers.

In 2013, Sarajevo International Airport handled 665,638 passengers which was more than all of the other airports in Bosnia and Herzegovina combined and a 14.7% increase from 2012. This was till then the highest number of passengers per year since the reopening of the airport. On 26 December 2014, the airport welcomed its 700,000th passenger on Austrian Airlines flight OS758 to Vienna.

In May 2015, work started on expansion of Sarajevo International Airport. Current work is undergoing on expansion of arrival area, adding more passport control check stands and rearranging whole arrival area to make it more passenger friendly. Next to follow is expansion of check in area which will include three more check in counters making it total of 15 check in counters. By the end of the year the airport will begin with platform expansion and the construction of rapid exit taxiway with scheduled completion by mid of the next year. 2017 should be the year in which airport will enter into the reconstruction of the runway and the maneuvering areas. Expansion of the airport at the current level is financed by Sarajevo Airport own funds. On 6 June 2015, Pope Francis visited Sarajevo arriving on an Alitalia Airbus A320-200 from Rome. Welcome ceremony was held at Sarajevo International Airport.

The airport served as the home base for the country's flag carrier, B&H Airlines, until July 2015 when the airline ceased operations. During December 2015, Sarajevo Airport experienced very low visibility and fog. About 40% of flights were canceled which impacted passengers growth and financial loss to the airport. Airport handled only 28,167 passengers of 50,000 planned (last year in December 43,079 passengers were handled). For Sarajevo International Airport one of major restrictions is a mountain terrain that requires a high approach precision and a big inclination angle in a procedure of unsuccessful approach and landing. Vlado Jurić, Head of the Office for aviation safety at Bosnia and Herzegovina Air Navigation Services Agency (BHANSA), presented the information about problems caused by reduced minimums at Sarajevo Airport. For the implementation of ILS categories (CAT II or CAT III), the terrain in front of the runway start should be free of obstacles for at least 1,000 metres. It means that the RWY 12 threshold should be moved for additional 200 metres which would reduce the runway length and as such is unacceptable. From the point of view of procedure design, the reduction of minimums is not an option and therefore it is necessary to find other solutions for improvement of landing conditions at Sarajevo Airport. The biggest problem at Sarajevo Airport is fog. The representative of Sarajevo Airport, Mr Nermin Zijadić informed that there is a relevant plan regarding this problem. He also presented the information about future projects of Sarajevo Airport among which the most important one is a reconstruction of the runway including its lighting system.

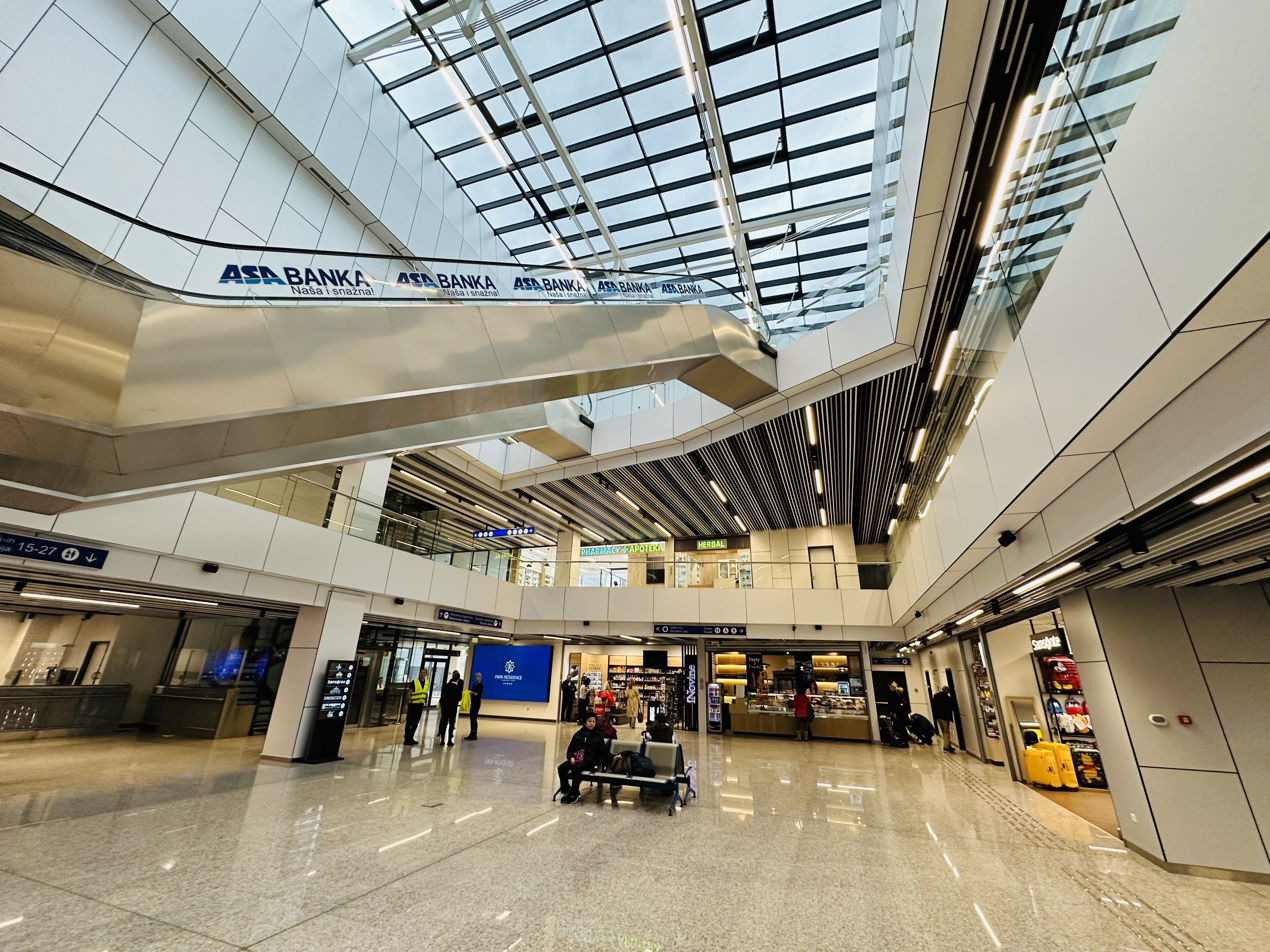
Check-in hall

In 2016, Qatar Airways announced a new route from Doha to Sarajevo. However, the start of this service was first postponed and then moved to 10 October 2017. with four weekly flights. On 5 December 2016, the airport welcomed its 800,000th passenger on Air Serbia flight JU113 to Belgrade.

In 2017, Sarajevo International Airport welcomed six new airlines and seven destinations: AtlasGlobal (Istanbul), Wizz Air (Budapest), Wataniya Airways (Kuwait City), Nesma Airlines (Riyadh), TUI fly Belgium (Charleroi), flydubai (Dubai), Qatar Airways (Doha).

On 28 November 2017, Sarajevo International Airport received its 900,000th passenger of the year, representing a record number of passengers in one calendar year. On 5 December 2018, Sarajevo International Airport welcomed for the first time its millionth passenger of the year.

On 3 May 2017, the airport announced a major terminal expansion. The project is worth 20 million Euros and scheduled to be completed in 2020. A new, 10,000 sqm building on four levels will be built as an addition to the current terminal building. The new terminal will have capacity to handle 2 million passengers per year and will be equipped with three jet bridges. On 9 April 2019, the airport announced expansion of the VIP area into a new VIP building as part of the expansion project for the new main terminal with a separate check-in, customs and arrival section for VIP travellers. During June–July 2019, the airport saw its largest destination expansion. A total of 10 new destinations were added. FlyBosnia started flights from Sarajevo to Riyadh, Kuwait, Jeddah, Gassim, and Bahrain. Flynas started flights from Riyadh and Jeddah. Norwegian started flights from Gothenburg, while Eurowings started flights from Berlin Tegel Airport. In October and November 2019, FlyBosnia started flights to London Luton and Rome Fiumicino Airport.

=== 2020s ===
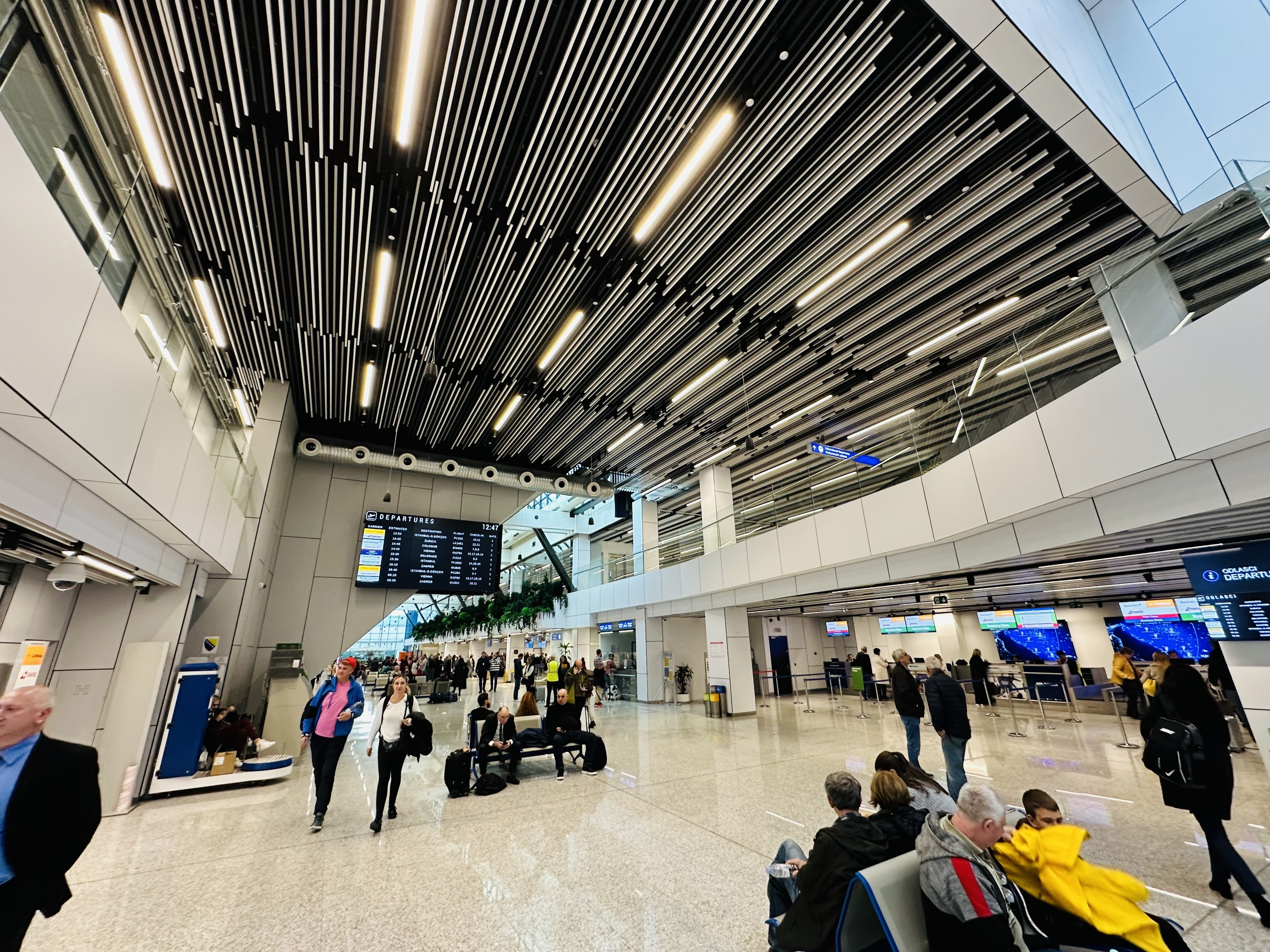
Renovated interior terminal

On 17 November 2020, Sarajevo International Airport terminated its contract with FlyBosnia after the company failed to repay its debts within 60 days.

On 3 February 2021, Wizz Air announced the opening of its second base in Bosnia and Herzegovina, after Tuzla; the airline will open a base at Sarajevo with one Airbus A320. The airline announced nine new European destinations from Sarajevo with 21 weekly departures. On 12 August 2021, Wizz Air has subsequently announced that it will base its second aircraft at Sarajevo International Airport. It is planned to launch 7 new routes from December 2021. Also, Wizz Air Abu Dhabi plans to introduce direct routes between Sarajevo and Abu Dhabi in October 2021. However, in September 2022, Wizz Air announced it would close its base at the airport, ending all routes except those to London and Abu Dhabi.

In 2024 Ryanair introduced six routes connecting Sarajevo with: Bergamo, Charleroi, Gothenburg, London–Stansted, Memmingen and Thessaloniki. Ryanair doubles traffic at Sarajevo for Summer 2025 with five new routes – Karlsruhe/Baden-Baden Airport, Weeze Airport, Girona Costa Brava Airport, Paris Beauvais Airport, and Stockholm Arlanda Airport, bringing Sarajevo route network to 11 in eight countries

== Airlines and destinations ==
=== Passenger ===
The following airlines operate regular scheduled and charter flights at Sarajevo International Airport:

Airlines	Destinations
Air Serbia	Belgrade
AJet	Istanbul–Sabiha Gökçen; Seasonal: Ankara, Bodrum
Arkia	Seasonal: Tel Aviv
Austrian Airlines	Vienna
Croatia Airlines	Zagreb
EasyJet	Basel/Mulhouse (begins 10 May 2027), Geneva (begins 22 April 2027)
Eurowings	Cologne/Bonn, Stuttgart; Seasonal: Berlin
Flydubai	Dubai–International
Flynas	Jeddah; Seasonal: Riyadh
Israir	Seasonal: Tel Aviv
Jazeera Airways	Seasonal: Kuwait City
Kuwait Airways	Seasonal: Kuwait City
LOT Polish Airlines	Seasonal: Warsaw–Chopin
Lufthansa	Frankfurt
Nile Air	Seasonal charter: Hurghada
Norwegian Air Shuttle	Seasonal: Copenhagen, Oslo, Stockholm–Arlanda
Nouvelair	Seasonal charter: Monastir
Pegasus Airlines	Istanbul–Sabiha Gökçen; Seasonal: Antalya
Ryanair	Seasonal: Beauvais, Bergamo, Charleroi, Girona, Gothenburg, Karlsruhe/Baden-Baden, London–Stansted, Memmingen, Stockholm–Arlanda, Weeze
SalamAir	Seasonal: Muscat
SunExpress	Antalya; Seasonal: Izmir
Swiss International Air Lines	Zürich
Transavia	Seasonal: Paris–Orly
Turkish Airlines	Istanbul
Wizz Air	Berlin (begins 3 December 2026), Bratislava (begins 3 December 2026), Friedrichshafen (begins 27 February 2027), London–Luton, Prague (begins 18 December 2026), Rome–Fiumicino

=== Cargo ===
Airlines	Destinations
DHL Aviation	Ancona, Milan–Malpensa, Zagreb

== Statistics ==
=== Traffic figures ===
Passenger numbers
_{Year/} _{Month}	January	February	March	April	May	June	July	August	September	October	November	December	Year total	Change
2026	121,762	110,164	136,258	177,186	202,074	213,178	284,301	306,949	231,725	189,472			1,963,069	▲0.4%
2025	116,283	105,463	112,056	185,911	197,260	230,771	292,574	311,827	221,966	181,426	137,953	133,202	2,226,692	▲22.2%
2024	77,454	75,112	82,926	133,822	151,152	202,515	269,161	259,017	188,040	148,402	123,146	111,033	1,821,762	▲33.8%
2023	61,068	56,979	76,193	89,580	115,976	133,945	196,195	208,570	144,013	119,458	83,139	76,891	1,362,007	▼1.1%
2022	56,521	50,475	70,292	94,690	132,590	154,887	210,954	217,253	143,824	110,580	68,243	67,039	1,377,348	▲79.5%
2021	13,239	10,836	18,115	17,106	31,925	71,985	136,017	151,309	99,950	84,462	61,989	70,200	767,133	▲207.2%
2020	58,397	51,969	28,249	929	367	3,629	13,345	22,014	21,011	21,416	14,949	13,367	249,642	▼78.2%
2019	53,485	53,130	67,893	89,843	74,178	119,205	180,929	178,943	105,370	95,628	67,358	57,718	1,143,680	▲9.3%
2018	54,113	48,986	65,991	86,995	81,026	92,997	159,380	159,506	98,227	83,660	62,253	53,417	1,046,635	▲9.2%
2017	43,377	41,122	57,381	79,796	84,137	78,170	140,025	144,330	100,923	80,769	57,887	50,218	957,971	▲14.2%
2016	41,208	42,567	53,438	68,085	85,738	66,429	109,141	118,350	91,123	71,360	47,352	44,183	838,968	▲8.5%
2015	43,700	39,908	50,273	63,064	80,143	74,855	89,319	101,307	79,120	71,255	51,793	28,167	772,904	▲8.8%
2014	36,114	35,435	45,789	56,611	71,513	74,976	74,948	88,591	71,168	64,844	46,833	43,079	709,901	▲6.6%
2013	33,437	30,399	44,631	56,918	65,495	72,949	69,699	79,796	66,721	64,387	44,446	36,760	665,638	▲14.7%
2012	33,247	26,278	36,765	49,709	55,107	62,491	69,346	60,787	60,323	52,115	38,612	35,278	580,058	▼3.3%
2011	30,484	34,148	40,803	49,489	56,812	62,994	81,042	59,042	59,074	52,957	39,785	33,348	599,978	▲6.5%
2010	31,746	28,850	37,657	39,907	51,398	59,636	72,615	60,475	54,753	51,137	40,912	34,180	563,266	▲6.2%
2009	28,117	27,266	33,909	41,390	45,921	57,588	+	+	177,762	+	+	121,427	530,391	▲4.7%
2008	23,909	27,121	34,896	38,052	46,974	55,391	62,524	61,560	42,752	46,094	34,089	32,913	506,398	▲0.2%
2007	32,235	28,028	35,168	42,297	43,633	53,281	59,436	57,381	45,113	43,980	31,952	32,735	505,269	▲8.4%

=== Passengers, cargo and movements ===
Year	Passengers	Change	Aircraft movements	Change	Cargo (t)	Change
2002	310,126	▼4.1%	7,401	▲%	1,686	▲%
2003	364,512	▲17.5%	9,877	▲33.4%	1,648	▼2.2%
2004	399,607	▲11%	9,982	▲1.0%	N/A	N/A
2005	433,222	▲8.4%	11,309	▲13.2%	N/A	N/A
2006	455,626	▲5.1%	13,433	▲18.7%	N/A	N/A
2007	496,756	▲9.0%	13,891	▲3.4%	N/A	N/A
2008	510,396	▲2.7%	13,599	▼2.1%	1,837	N/A
2009	533,915	▲4.7%	13,824	▲1.6%	1,815	▼1.1%
2010	563,266	▲6.2%	13,347	▼3.4%	1,753	▼3.4%
2011	599,978	▲6.5%	11,633	▼12.8%	1,607	▼8.3%
2012	580,058	▼3.3%	10,635	▼8.5%	1,526	▼5.0%
2013	665,638	▲14.7%	11,026	▲3.6%	1,603	▲5.0%
2014	709,901	▲6.6%	12,074	▲9.5%	2,060	▲28.5%
2015	772,904	▲8.8%	11,107	▼8.0%	4,235	▲105.5%
2016	838,966	▲8.5%	11,399	▲2.6%	2,865	▼32.3%
2017	957,971	▲14.2%	12,773	▲12.0%	2,957	▲3.2%
2018	1,046,635	▲9.2%	13,432	▲5.1%	2,508	▼15.1%
2019	1,143,680	▲9,3%	13,671	▲1.8%	2,523	▲0.6%
2020	249,642	▼78.1%	5,896	▼56.8%	2,461	▼2.4%
2021	767,133	▲207.2%	11,467	▲94.4%	2,249	▼8.7%

=== Busiest routes ===
Top 15 busiest routes from Sarajevo in 2023
Rank	Airport	Passengers	Airlines
1	Istanbul	233,331	Turkish Airlines
2	Sabiha Gökçen	229,414	AJet, Pegasus Airlines
3	Vienna	166,057	Austrian Airlines
4	Frankfurt	104,842	Lufthansa
5	Abu Dhabi	98,124	Wizz Air Abu Dhabi
6	Dubai	73,390	Flydubai
7	Zagreb	53,187	Croatia Airlines
8	Antalya	47,938	Pegasus Airlines, SunExpress
9	Belgrade	39,855	Air Serbia
10	Zurich	38,743	Swiss International Air Lines
11	Kuwait City	36,321	Kuwait Airways
12	Cologne/Bonn	35,417	Eurowings
13	Riyadh	34,830	Flynas
14	Stuttgart	23,471	Eurowings
15	Jeddah	22,421	Flynas

== Transport ==
=== By car ===
Sarajevo Airport is connected to the Sarajevo–Zenica–Mostar highway (A1) via the nearby Stup Interchange and Briješće Interchange.

The airport is accessible by taxi and private vehicles, with a dedicated drop-off and pick-up area in front of Terminal B. Multiple car rental companies operate directly at the airport, offering vehicles for short-term and long-term rental. Parking facilities include both short-term and long-term parking lots, as well as designated spaces for premium and disabled passengers. Traffic signage is well-marked, and the journey from Sarajevo city center typically takes about 20–25 minutes under normal traffic conditions.

=== By bus and public transport ===
Regular city bus services connect Sarajevo Airport with the city center. Bus line 200E operates between the airport and Sarajevo central areas, including key locations such as the Old Town and the main bus terminal. Buses run at intervals of approximately 30–60 minutes, depending on the day and time. Tickets can be purchased onboard or at designated kiosks.

=== Taxi and shuttle services ===
Taxis are available outside Terminal B. Licensed airport taxis offer fixed rates to major parts of Sarajevo. Several shuttle services and hotel transfer options are also available, which can be booked in advance.

=== Rent a car ===
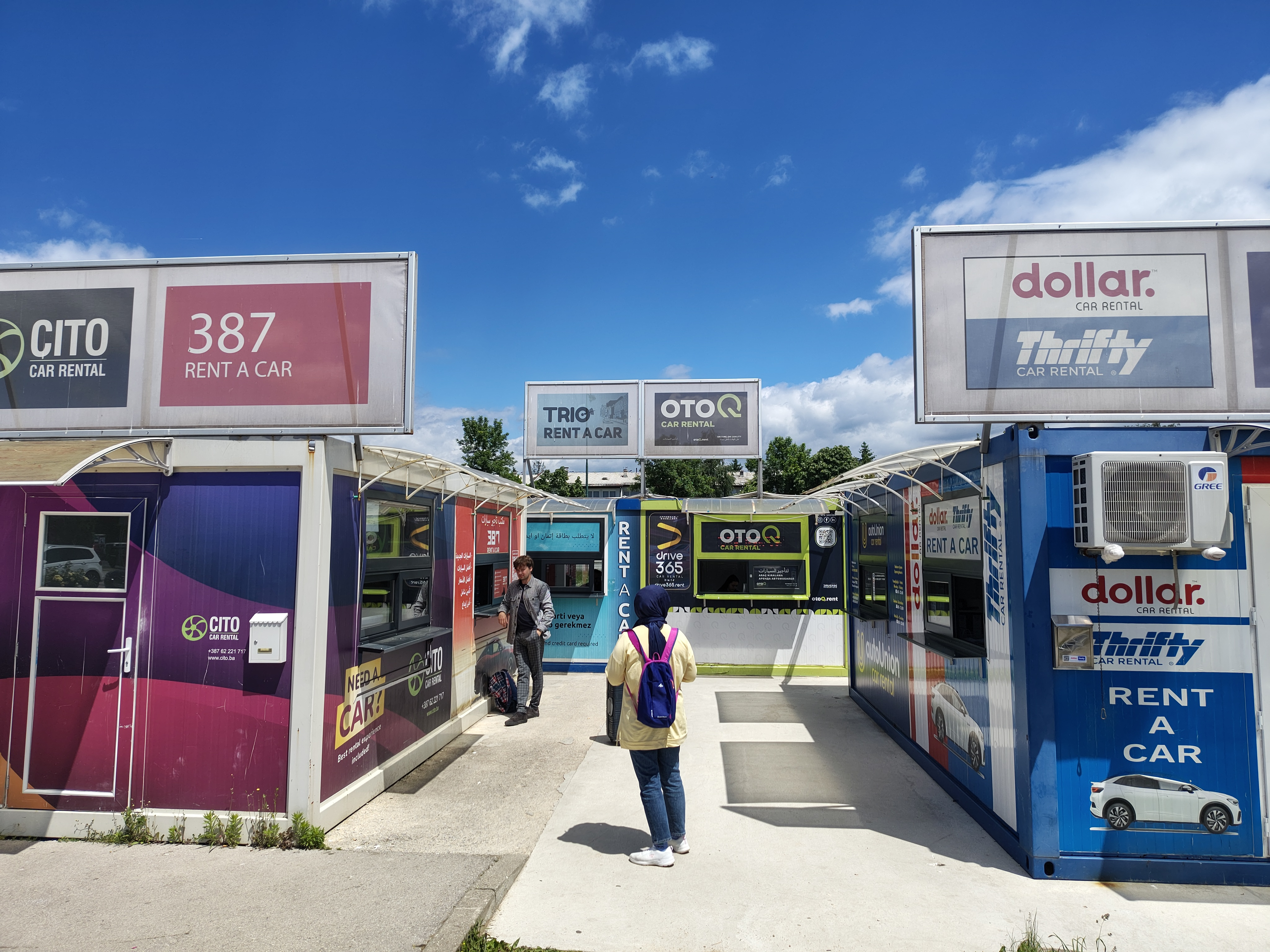
Car rental kiosks at Sarajevo Airport

Numerous car rental agencies operate at Sarajevo Airport, enabling passengers to rent a vehicle immediately upon arrival. These services offer a variety of vehicles for business travelers and tourists visiting Sarajevo and other destinations across Bosnia and Herzegovina. Additional information about car rental services at the airport can be found on the official local website.

=== By trolleybus ===
The airport is connected with Sarajevo's city center with trolleybus number 103, operated by the GRAS transport company.

== Accidents and incidents ==
- 18 January 1977: Džemal Bijedić, then prime minister of Yugoslavia, and his wife were among the eight people killed when their Learjet 25 crashed on the Inač mountain near Kreševo, Bosnia and Herzegovina. The plane took off from Batajnica Air Base in Belgrade and was en route to Sarajevo when it crashed, ostensibly due to poor weather conditions. Conspiracy theorists have suggested that the crash was not an accident but rather the result of foul play at the hands of his rivals.
- 31 December 1994: A Belair Ilyushin-76TD cargo plane, registration EW-76836, was operating on a flight from Luxembourg to Sarajevo on behalf of the United Nations. At the time of landing at Sarajevo airport, the runway was flooded and the aircraft overran the runway and struck a ditch with the nose gear. There were no fatalities among the 11 people on board, but the aircraft was damaged beyond repair.

== See also ==
- List of airports in Bosnia and Herzegovina
- Tuzla International Airport
- Mostar International Airport
- Banja Luka International Airport
