= M-17 road (Bosnia and Herzegovina) =

Road in Bosnia and Herzegovina

Magistral Road M17
- Magistralna cesta M17

Route information
- Part of
- Length: 400 km (250 mi)

Major junctions
- From: Šamac
- To: Doljani

Location
- Country: Bosnia and Herzegovina
- Major cities: Šamac; Modriča; Doboj; Zenica; Sarajevo; Konjic; Mostar; Čapljina

Highway system
- Transport in Bosnia and Herzegovina

The M-17 main road is a main road in Bosnia and Herzegovina. The road is a part of European route E73. It runs from northern Croatian border in Šamac towards southern Croatian border in Doljani near Čapljina.
