= Doljani, Čapljina =

Doljani Дољани
- Village
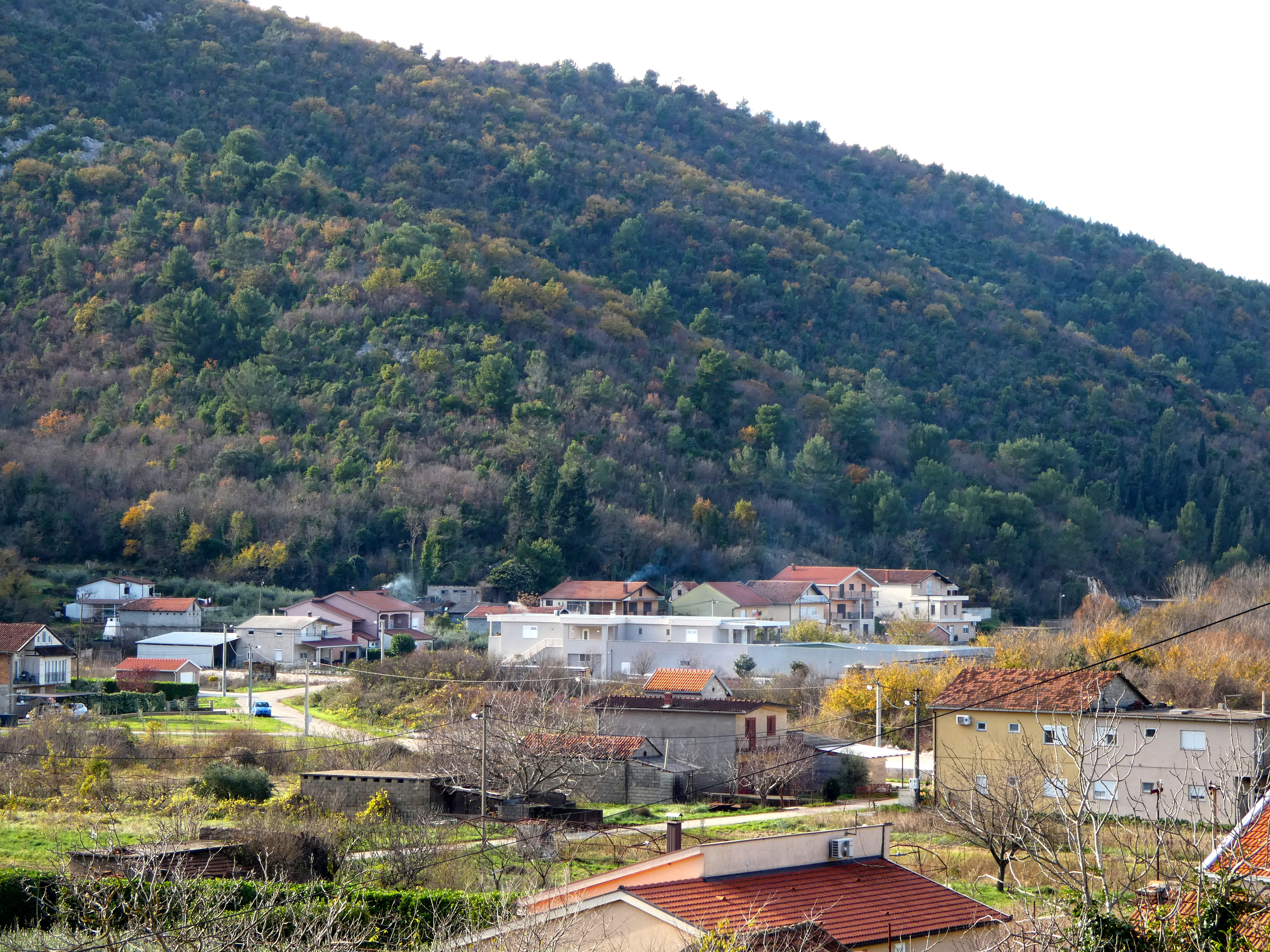

- Location within Bosnia and Herzegovina
- Coordinates: 43°02′44″N 17°40′48″E
- Country: Bosnia and Herzegovina
- Entity: Federation of Bosnia and Herzegovina
- Canton: Herzegovina-Neretva
- Municipality: Čapljina

Area
  - Total: 1.59 sq mi (4.13 km^{2})

Population (2013)
  - Total: 495
  - Density: 310/sq mi (120/km^{2})
- Time zone: UTC+1 (CET)
  - Summer (DST): UTC+2 (CEST)

Doljani (Serbian Cyrillic: Дољани) is a village in Bosnia and Herzegovina. According to the 1991 census, the village is located in the municipality of Čapljina.

== Demographics ==
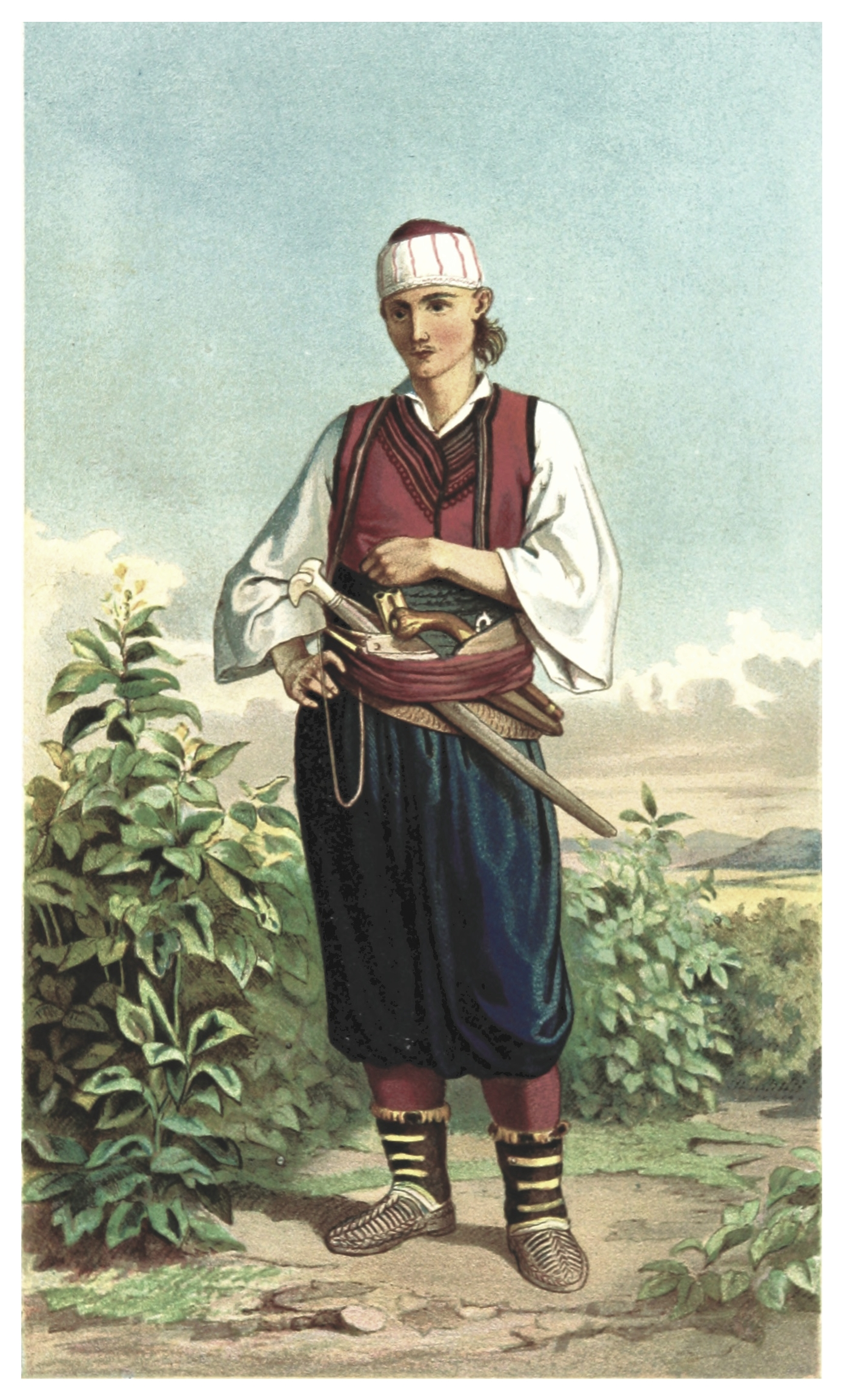
Man from Doljani (1870).

According to the 2013 census, its population was 495.

Ethnicity in 2013
Ethnicity	Number	Percentage
Croats	494	99.8%
other/undeclared	1	0.2%
Total	495	100%
