= Čičevo =

Čičevo (Serbian Cyrillic: Чичево) may refer to:

- Čičevo, Konjic, in central Bosnia and Herzegovina
- Donje Čičevo, in southern Bosnia and Herzegovina
- Gornje Čičevo, in southern Bosnia and Herzegovina
- Poljice Čičevo, in southern Bosnia and Herzegovina
- Dolno Čičevo, in central Republic of Macedonia
- Gorno Čičevo, in central Republic of Macedonia
