= Hodilje =

- Settlement
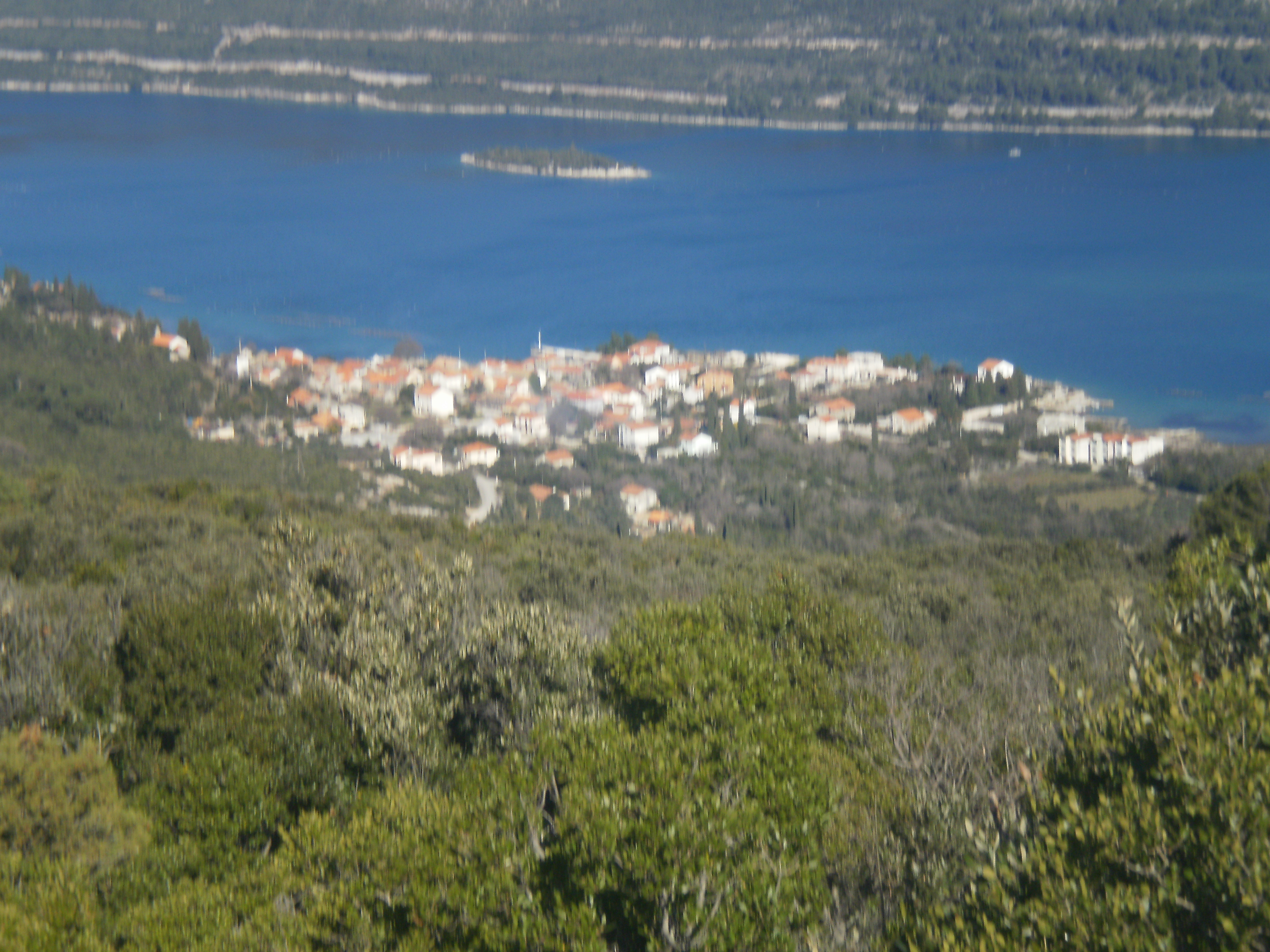
- Hodilje and islet of Banja as seen from the south

- Location within Croatia
- Coordinates: 42°51′25″N 17°41′22″E
- Country: Croatia
- County: Dubrovnik-Neretva County
- Municipality: Ston

Area
  - Total: 0.97 sq mi (2.5 km^{2})

Population (2021)
  - Total: 160
  - Density: 170/sq mi (64/km^{2})
- Time zone: UTC+1 (CET)
  - Summer (DST): UTC+2 (CEST)
- Postal code: 20230 Ston

Hodilje is a village located in the municipality of Ston, in the Dubrovnik-Neretva County, Croatia. The village is situated on the Pelješac peninsula.

== Geography ==
Hodilje is located at 42° 51' 25N and 17° 41' 22E. It is divided into 4 parts: Hodilje, Malo Selo, Luka and Rusan. Hodilje lies near the Zjat hill and the sea coast. Almost all villagers are fishermen. There is an old church dedicated to St John in the village.

== Demographics ==
According to the 2021 census, its population was 160. It was 214 in 2001.

== Family names of the villagers ==
The family names of the villagers include: Bajurin, Krile, Ficović, Antunica, Kokotić, Garbin, Mjehović, Vukašin, Delo, Ljubić (Tupanović), Glunčić, Car, Dražeta, Kolunđija, Dropuljić, Glavinić, Marinović, Kitin, Katić, Đuračić, Pavlović, Franušić, Prkut, etc.

== See also ==
- Dubrovnik-Neretva County
- Dalmatia
- Pelješac
