= Dražeta =

South Slavic surname and archaic personal name

Dražeta Дражета
- Gender: Masculine
- Language: Serbo-Croatian

Origin
- Meaning: drag (dear)
- Region of origin: Balkans

Other names
- Short form: Draže (supposed older variant)
- Anglicisation: Drazeta
- Related names: Dražetin (surname); Dražetić (surname)

Dražeta (Serbian Cyrillic: Дражета), in some English-language sources also rendered as Drazeta, is a relatively rare South Slavic surname and an archaic given name. It is historically attested in five locations within the territory of the former Yugoslavia: Mošorin (Serbia), Stari Banovci (Serbia), Ivoševci (Croatia), Hodilje (Croatia), and Jajce (Bosnia and Herzegovina).

Individuals bearing the surname in Mošorin, Stari Banovci, and Ivoševci are identified as Orthodox Serbs, while those in Hodilje and Jajce are identified as Catholic Croats. The family slava (patron saint) traditionally associated with Orthodox families bearing the surname Dražeta is Saint Stephen.

There are unconfirmed claims that individuals with the surname Dražeta who identify as Muslim Bosniaks reside in western Bosnia, near Prijedor; however, these claims lack reliable verification.

== Origin ==
The surname Dražeta is derived from the South Slavic given name Dražeta, which is first recorded in the 12th century in Herzegovina. The given name Dražeta originates from an older variant, Draže, which itself is derived from the Slavic root drag, meaning "dear" or "beloved" in English.

The precise time and place of the emergence of the surname Dražeta remain unclear, as the earliest reliable records of the surname date to the 18th century. An earlier record from 1521 mentions an individual named Dražeta Radivoj in the village of Desići, in present-day Montenegro; however, it is uncertain whether Dražeta in this instance refers to a given name or a surname.

== Surname history ==
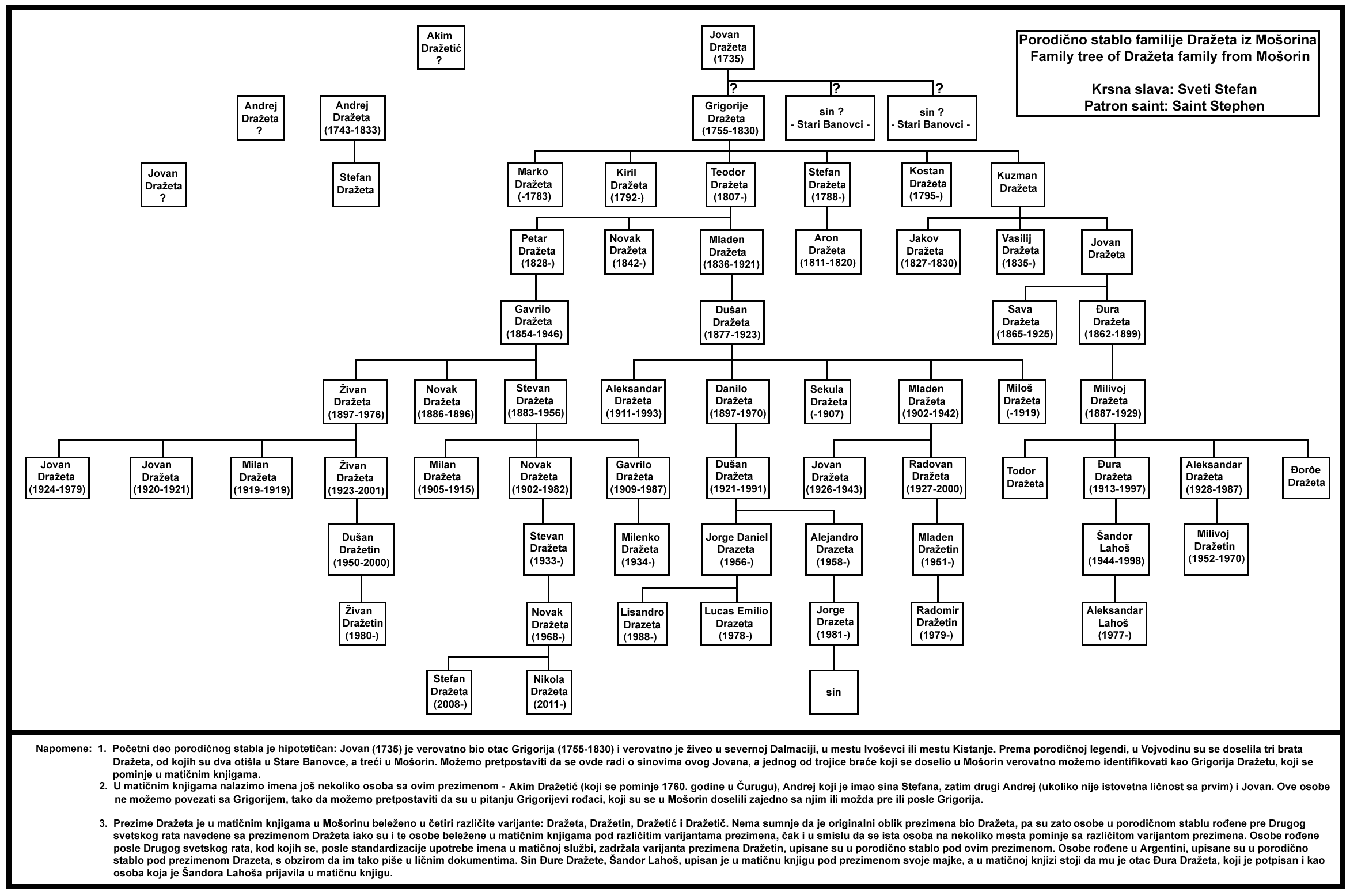
Family tree of the Dražeta family from Mošorin

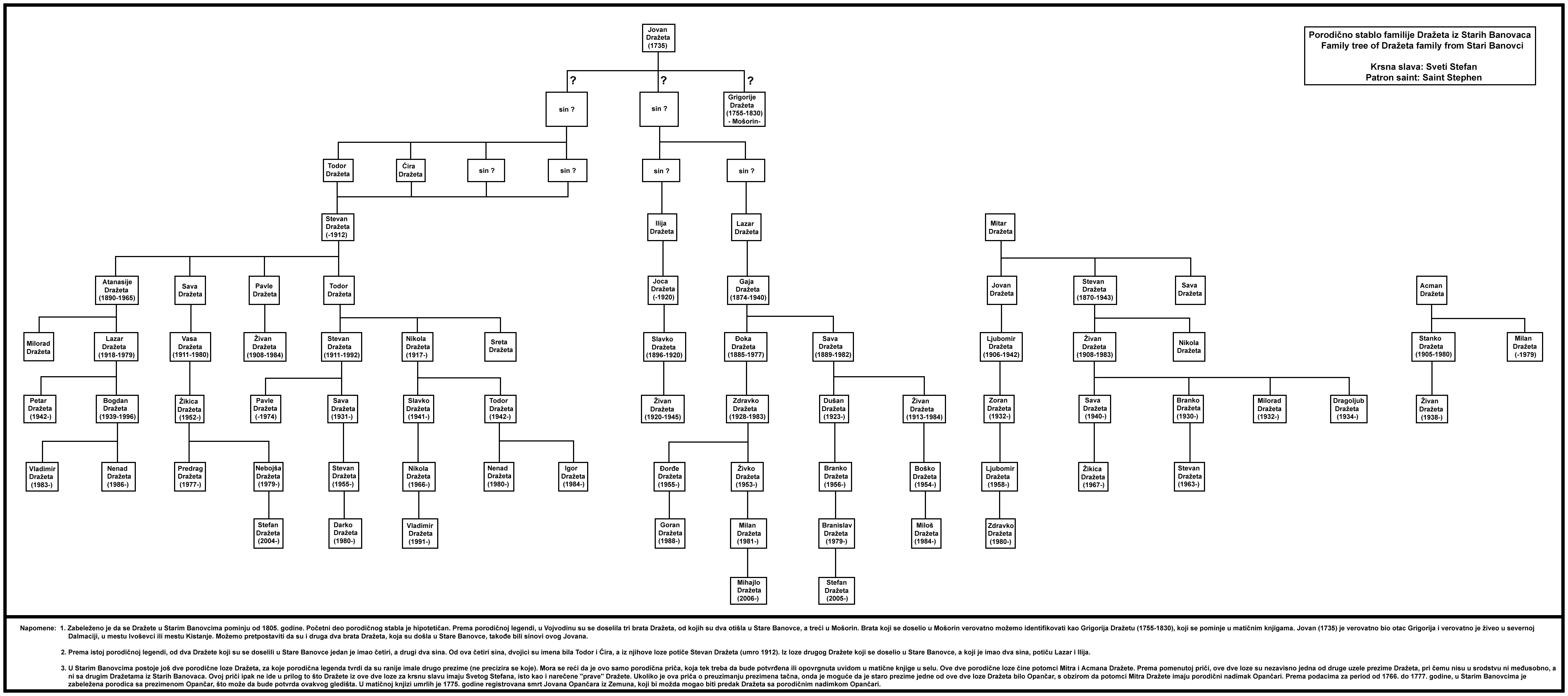
Family tree of the Dražeta family from Stari Banovci

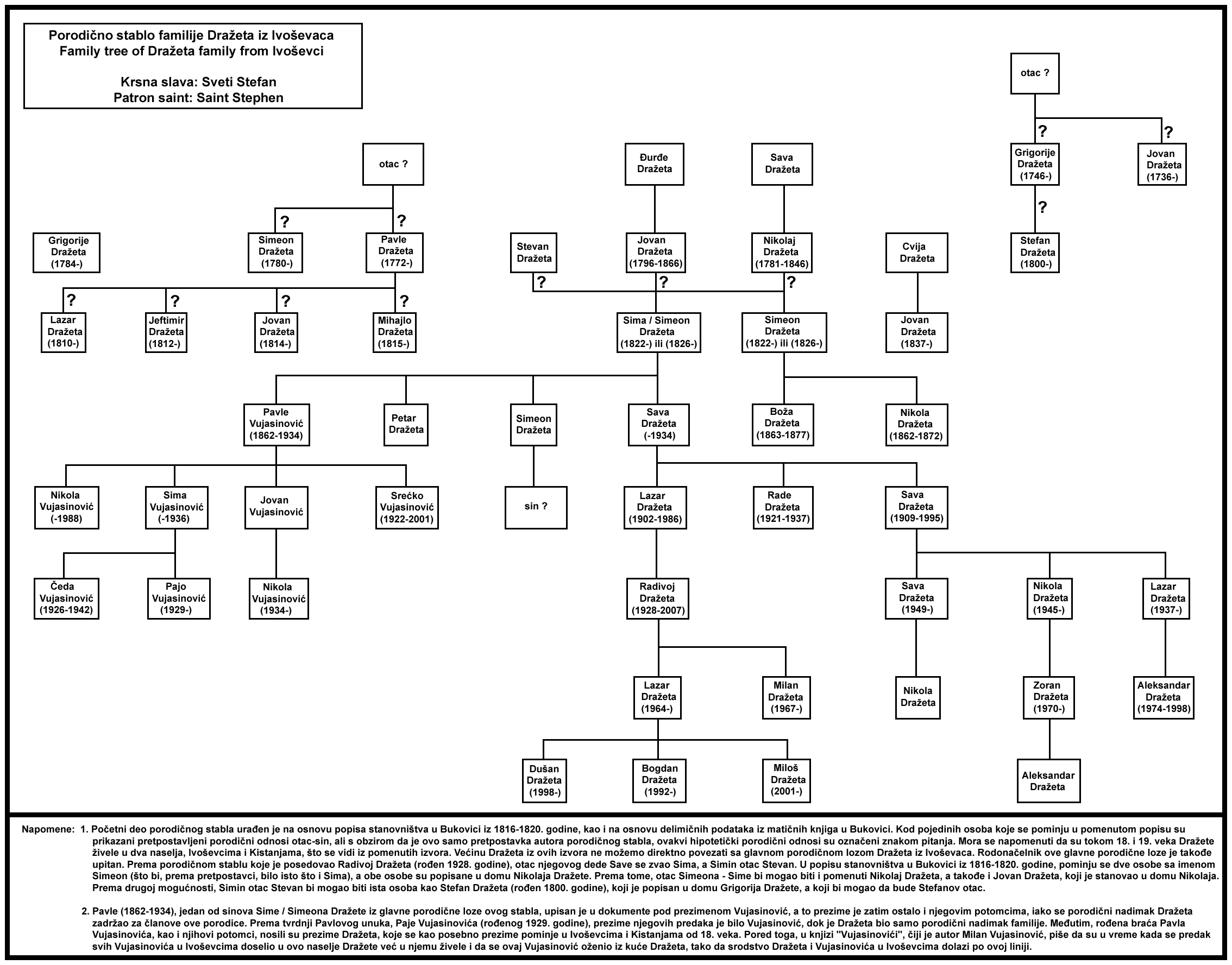
Family tree of the Dražeta family from Ivoševci

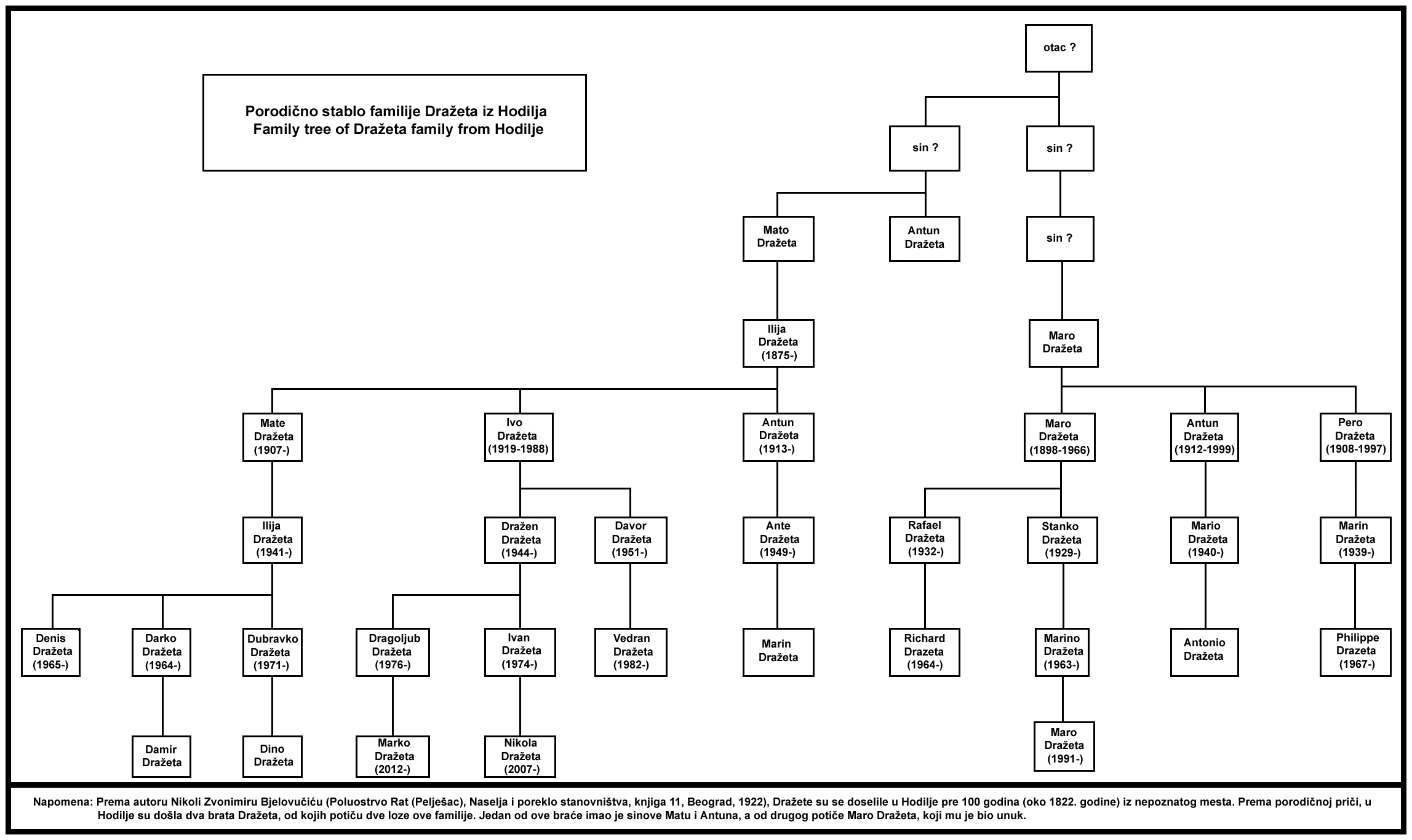
Family tree of the Dražeta family from Hodilje

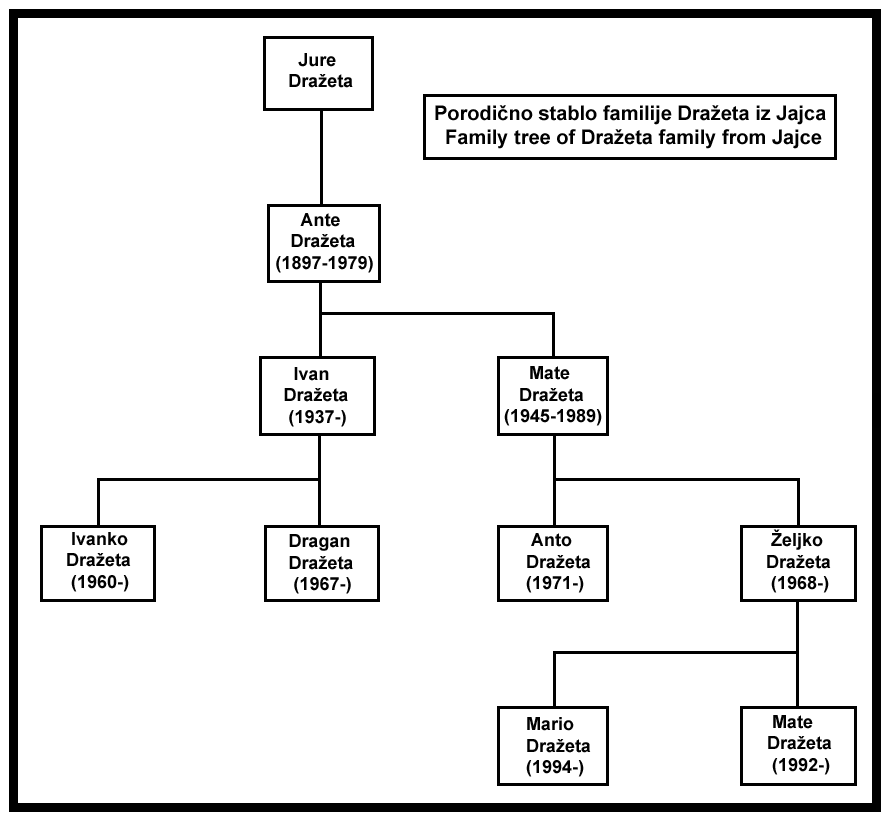
Family tree of the Dražeta family from Jajce

The surname Dražeta was recorded in Mošorin in 1783 and in Stari Banovci in 1805. Families bearing the surname in these two villages traditionally regarded one another as cousins, and historical accounts note that they frequently visited each other during family celebrations.

According to the Hronika Starih Banovaca, the Dražeta family settled in Stari Banovci after migrating from Croatia. In Mošorin, documents from 1783 record a man named Marko Dražeta, identified as the son of Grigorije "šijak". At the time, the term "šijak" was used to denote immigrants from Croatia. As the surname Dražeta is also attested in the village of Ivoševci in northern Dalmatia, it is assumed that members of the Dražeta family migrated from that area to Mošorin and Stari Banovci.

Further support for this proposed origin is found in the shared family patron saint, Saint Stephen, which is traditionally celebrated by Dražeta families in Mošorin, Stari Banovci, and Ivoševci. Dušan J. Popović noted in his work Srbi u Vojvodini that the villages of Mošorin and Vilovo were inhabited by a notably large number of "šijaks" originating from Dalmatia and Croatia.

Regarding the origins of the Dražeta family in Ivoševci, oral tradition emphasizes close kinship ties between the Dražeta and Vujasinović families. Families bearing these surnames in Ivoševci consider themselves related, and two main accounts exist concerning their relationship. According to one account, Vujasinović was the original surname of the Dražeta family, while Dražeta was initially a nickname that later developed into a distinct surname. This account is supported by the fact that both families celebrate the same patron saint, Saint Stephen, consistent with a traditional practice among Serbs in which a family could change its surname but not its patron saint.

An alternative account holds that Vujasinović was not a former surname of the Dražeta family, but that both families migrated to Ivoševci from the village of Lužci near Sanski Most in western Bosnia. According to this version, the kinship between the two families arose because the wife of the ancestor of the Vujasinović family belonged to the Dražeta family. Unconfirmed accounts also mention the presence of a Dražeta family of Muslim faith in western Bosnia, near Prijedor, which has been cited as possible indirect support for a western Bosnian origin of the Dražeta family in Ivoševci.

In Prezimena Srba u Bosni, data are presented indicating the presence of families with the surnames Vujasinović and Vujasin in the areas around Prijedor and Sanski Most, both of which traditionally celebrate Saint Stephen as their patron saint. This supports the view that the Vujasinović family of Ivoševci originated in western Bosnia.

According to Antroponimija Bukovice by Živko Bjelanović, the population of eastern Dalmatian Bukovica, including Ivoševci, migrated to the region from western Bosnia at the end of the 17th century. This suggests a western Bosnian origin for the Dražeta family, regardless of whether the surname at the time of settlement in Ivoševci was Dražeta or Vujasinović. Janjatović further notes that the majority of Serbian and Croatian surnames were formed during the 16th and 17th centuries, a period during which the ancestors of the Dražeta family likely lived in western Bosnia. This period is therefore considered the probable time and place of the surname's formation.

Bjelanović also states that populations settling in western Bosnia, Lika, and Dalmatia during the 16th and 17th centuries largely originated from Montenegro and Herzegovina, particularly from the region between the Piva, Tara, Lim, and the upper Neretva.

In Montenegro, a record from 1521 mentions an individual named Dražeta Radivoj in the village of Desići. However, it remains unclear whether Dražeta in this case refers to a given name or a surname. Additional unconfirmed accounts suggest that a family bearing the surname Dražeta once lived in Boka Kotorska, where they were reportedly of Orthodox faith.

With regard to the Dražeta families of Catholic faith from Hodilje and Jajce, it is uncertain whether these families are related to one another or to the Orthodox Dražeta families elsewhere. According to Nikola Zvonimir Bjelovučić, the Dražeta family settled in Hodilje approximately 100 years prior to the publication of his work (c. 1822), having arrived from an unspecified location. Various unconfirmed traditions suggest possible origins in Herzegovina, northern Dalmatia, Vojvodina, or Zagorje.

Additional unverified accounts claim that the ancestors of the Dražeta family from Hodilje were formerly either Orthodox Christians or Muslims, a narrative that parallels claims regarding a Muslim Dražeta family in western Bosnia. Another unconfirmed tradition states that the earlier surname of the Hodilje Dražeta family was either Delo or Ruda.

As for the Dražeta family from Jajce, their place of origin and the date of their settlement remain unknown. One account suggests that they originated in southern Dalmatia, possibly from Hodilje, while another proposes an origin in Vojvodina. The former account is sometimes considered more plausible, as the Dražeta families in southern Dalmatia and Jajce are of Catholic faith, whereas those in Vojvodina are predominantly Orthodox.

== Similar names and surnames ==
The personal name Dražeta is attested in historical documents dating to the 12th century. The related personal name or surname Dražetin, derived from Dražeta, appears in records from the 14th century. Although rare, the personal name Dražeta has continued to be used into the modern period. According to the 2004 telephone directory of Croatia, one individual named Dražeta Davidović resided in Knin. In addition, an individual named Dražeta Dražetić was the author of an article published in the Croatian journal Mljekarstvo (issue no. 3, 2003).

According to parish and civil registry records in the village of Mošorin, the surname appears in four recorded variants: Dražeta (Дражета), Dražetin (Дражетин), Dražetić (Дражетић), and Dražetič (Дражетич). Local records indicate that Dražeta represents the earliest form of the surname. In contemporary usage among the Dražeta family in Mošorin, only the variants Dražeta and Dražetin remain in use, while Dražetić and Dražetič are no longer used.

The surname Dražetić is found in the villages of Turbe and Imljani in central Bosnia, as well as in several locations in Croatia, particularly near Petrinja, Slavonska Požega, Sisak, Velika Gorica, and Zagreb. The surname is first recorded historically in Šibenik in 1386. In 1416, a nobleman named Grgur Dražetić is mentioned as a neighbour of the Republic of Ragusa and as a ruler of part of Dalmatia that included Omiš. The surname Dražetić is also recorded in Velika Pisanica in Slavonia in 1783.

The surname Dražetić is generally considered to derive from the root Dražeta, though it is not always possible to determine whether this root functioned as a given name or a surname in specific cases. In instances where Dražetić developed from the surname Dražeta—as documented among the Dražeta family in Mošorin—the possibility of kinship between families bearing the surnames Dražetić and Dražeta has been suggested. Such considerations have been raised particularly in relation to the Dražeta families from Hodilje and Jajce, which are of Catholic faith, as are most families bearing the surname Dražetić. A Dražetić family of Orthodox faith is also recorded in the village of Golubinjak near Daruvar in Slavonia.

The surname Dražetič, found in Slovenia, is generally regarded as a spelling variant of Dražetić, reflecting the absence of the Serbo-Croatian letter ć in the Slovene alphabet.

In 1882, records from Sarajevo mention the surname Dražetović (Дражетовић). Families bearing this surname were identified as Orthodox Christians, with Saint Sava as their family patron saint. This surname is considered to derive not from Dražeta, but from the root Draže, which also underlies the personal name Dražeta.

In Srpski rječnik by Vuk Stefanović Karadžić (Vienna, 1852), the word dražetina is recorded as an augmentative form of draga, meaning "dear" or "beloved" in English.

== Historical records about the name Dražeta ==
=== Inscription from Čičevo ===
The earliest known record of the personal name Dražeta appears in a stone inscription in the Church of Saint Peter in Crnče, Donje Čičevo near Trebinje. The inscription is dated to the period between 1177 and 1200 and reads:

"Poleta, Drusan (Družan), and Dražeta buried their mother in the days of the glorious Duke Hramko (Hranko, Sranko)." (Original: "Poleta, Drusan (Družan), Dražeta činu raku nad materiju (materom) u dani slavnoga kneza Hramka.")

=== Bosnian Church supreme priest ===
At the beginning of the 13th century, one of the senior clerics of the Bosnian Church bore the name Dražeta. Two historical sources mention this individual: the Bilinopoljska izjava (Bilino Polje abjuration) and the list of djed of the Bosnian Church.

The Bilino Polje abjuration is a document in which the leaders of the Bosnian Church—sometimes identified in historical literature as Bogumils—formally renounced heresy before an emissary of Pope Innocent III. The statement was signed on 8 April 1203, in Bilino Polje near Zenica. One of the signatories was named Dražeta. Other priors listed in the document include Dragič, Ljubin, Pribiš, Ljuben, Radoš, and Vladoš. At the time, Dragič held the position of supreme priest (djed), while Ljubin and Dražeta served as his deputies (gosti). Both later became supreme priests themselves.

Following the signing of the abjuration, Ljubin and Dražeta travelled to King Emeric of Hungary, before whom they swore to uphold the provisions of the document. Despite this formal declaration, historical sources indicate that the members of the Bosnian Church, known as krstjani, continued to practise their faith largely unchanged.

Another reference to a Bosnian Church leader named Dražeta appears in the list of supreme priests preserved in the so-called Batal's Gospel (1393), written for the Bosnian nobleman Batal, who held the court title of tepačija. This list records the succession of supreme priests from the mid-11th century to 1393. According to the list, Ljuben succeeded Dragič as supreme priest, followed by Dražeta. Dražeta is therefore regarded as having served as djed of the Bosnian Church, likely between 1215 and 1220.

=== Inscription on a stećak ===
An inscription dated to 1258 and carved on a stećak (medieval Bosnian tombstone) mentions a stonecutter named Dražeta. The tombstone was discovered in Gornje Hrasno, between Neum and Stolac, in Bosnia and Herzegovina.

The inscription reads:

"A se leži Ljubljen u Vrhbosni rožden u Vrhbosni zakopan na svojini na plemenitoj."

("Here lies Ljubljen, born and buried in Vrhbosna, on his noble property.")

"Ja bjeh onaj tkoji cijel život na raskrsnicam stajah, razmišljah, oklijevah." ("I was the one who stood at the crossroads throughout my life, who reflected and hesitated.")

"Bjeh onaj tkoji se pitah kak to da nebo ne stari a iz njeg se stalno raždaju nova i nova godišnja doba."

("I was the one who asked how the sky does not grow old while new seasons are constantly born from it.")

"I u sobi gde bjeh bješe prozor, a iza prozora beskraj. Al ja uporno gledah u pod."

("And in the room where I dwelt there was a window, and beyond it infinity, yet I persistently looked at the floor.")

"I mišljah mojom smerti sve će to konačno stati. Al nije i moja smert sve starša i sve tješnja je."

("I thought that with my death all of this would finally cease, but it did not, and my death grows ever older and closer.")

"Kam mi usječe Dražeta a zapis upisa Husan ne da pokažu da bjeh već da me višlje neima. Ljeta Gospodnjeg 1258."

("My stone was carved by Dražeta and the inscription engraved by Husan, not to show that I existed, but that I exist no longer. In the year of Our Lord 1258.")

=== Hrisovulje of Dečani ===
The name Dražeta and the name or surname Dražetin appear in the Hrisovulje of Dečani (Dečanske hrisovulje), a set of medieval Serbian charters compiled during the construction of the Dečani Monastery in the first half of the 14th century. These documents include censuses of the population living on the monastic estates and were written around 1330–1331.

The name Dražeta is recorded in the Second Dečani Charter in the village of Dobra Reka, located in the territory of present-day Andrijevica municipality in Montenegro:

"Dragoje Hlapović a brat mu Dražeta"

("Dragoje Hlapović and his brother Dražeta")

The name or surname Dražetin appears in the Third Dečani Charter in the village of Vlasi Sremljane, located in the territory of present-day Đakovica municipality in Metohija:

"Bogoje i Dražetin"

("Bogoje and Dražetin")

According to Srpski prezimenik by Velimir Mihajlović (2002), Dražetin represents a surname in this instance, while Milica Grković, in Imena u Dečanskim hrisovuljama (1983), interprets it as a personal name.

=== Montenegrin defters ===
The Ottoman Haraç defter (tax register) of Montenegro from 1521 records a person named Dražeta Radivoj in the village of Desići. The same individual appears in the Imperial defter for Montenegro and the nahija of Grbalj from 1523, though under the name Dražeta Radonja and with the village listed as Lešnji Desići. Despite these variations, the records are understood to refer to the same person and settlement. It remains unclear whether Dražeta functions here as a given name or a surname.

=== Katastig of the Patriarchate of Peć ===
The name Dražeta is recorded in the settlement of Berčul in Banat in 1660, in the "Holy katastig of the monasteries of the Holy and Great Church of the Patriarchate of Peć". A katastig was a register documenting donations made to the Patriarchate.

When representatives of the Patriarchate visited Berčul in 1660, the following entry was recorded:

"Pridoše k nam kmetovi Dražeta, Toma i Radoica i prinesoše ot sela milostinju 1.000 aspri. Paki Dražeta pisa sebe pros, dade 110 aspri; Toma pisa sebe pros, dade 83 aspre; Radoica pisa sebe pros, — osta, — reče vola. Radovan Ćurčija prinese lisicu na blagoslov. Blagoje pisa škopca, osta." ("The village prefects Dražeta, Toma, and Radoica came to us and brought alms from the village in the amount of 1,000 aspri. Dražeta personally gave 110 aspri, Toma gave 83 aspri, and Radoica gave a bullock. Radovan Ćurčija brought a fox for blessing. Blagoje reported an emasculated animal.")

This record indicates that one of the village prefects (kmets) was named Dražeta. Based on the size of his donation, he is generally interpreted as having been among the wealthier inhabitants of the settlement.

== Notable people with this name or surname ==
- Dražeta, prior (supreme priest) of the Bosnian Church in the 13th century.
- Grgur Dražetić, a prince who ruled over part of Dalmatia in the 15th century.
- Dr. Mladen Dražetin, a social scientist, economist, university professor, theatre practitioner, actor, poet, and writer.
- Milivoj Dražetin (1952–1970), poet.
- Darko Dražeta, mayor of the municipality of Ston, Croatia.
- Lazar Dražeta, biologist.
- Lucas Drazeta, basketball player in Argentina.

== Place names similar to this name or surname ==
- Dražetice, a settlement in the Czech Republic. One of its neighbouring settlements is Nový Knín ("New Knin"), a fact that has prompted speculative discussion about a possible historical connection with northern Dalmatia, where similarly named locations and surnames—such as the town of Knin and the surname Dražeta—are attested.
