= Ljubić =

Ljubić may refer to:

- Ljubić (surname)
- Ljubić, Vitez, a village in Bosnia and Herzegovina
- Ljubić (Čačak), Serbia
  - Battle of Ljubić, 1815
- Ljubić (Knić), Serbia
