= Broce =

Broce may refer to:

- Johans Kristofs Broce, Latvian name of a German pedagogue and ethnographer
- Broce, Croatia, a village near Ston, Croatia
