= Walls of Ston =

Series of defensive walls in Croatia

- Stonske zidine
- Ston, Croatia
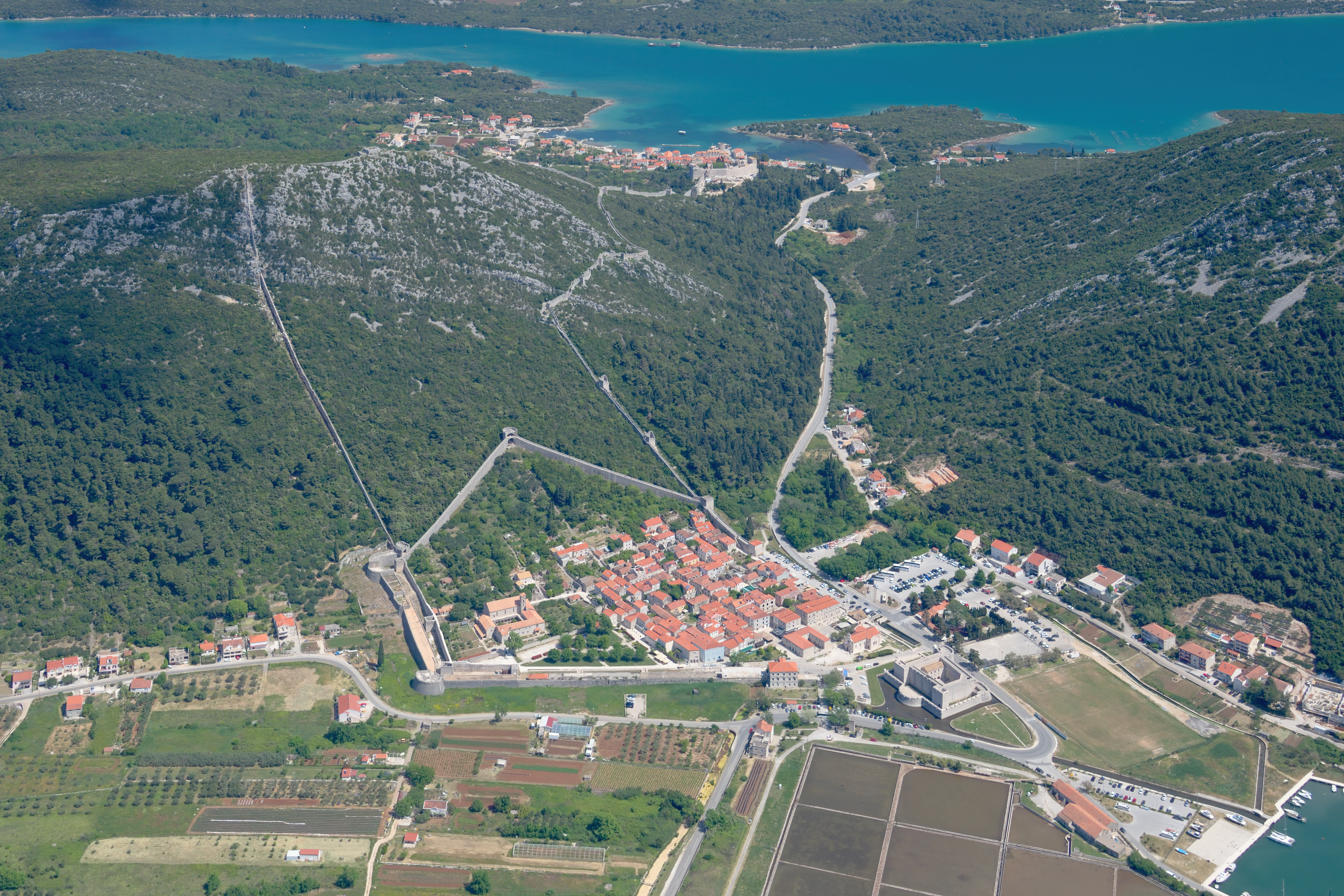
- Ston, Mali Ston and the walls of Ston

Site information
- Type: Walls
- Owner: City of Ston, Croatia
- Controlled by: Croatia
- Open to the public: Yes
- Condition: Preserved

Location
- Coordinates: 42.838°N 17.697°E

Site history
- Built: 14th century - 15th century
- Built by: Dubrovnik and Ston citizens
- Materials: Limestone

The Walls of Ston (Croatian: Stonske zidine) are a series of defensive stone walls, originally more than 7 kilometres (4.3 mi) long, that surrounded and protected the city of Ston, in Dalmatia, part of the Republic of Ragusa, in what is now southern Croatia. Their construction was begun in 1358. On the Field Gate of the Walls (Poljska vrata) there is a Latin inscription which dates from 1506. Today, it is among the longest preserved fortification systems in the world.

The Walls of Ston were known as the "European Great Wall of China".

== Construction ==
Despite being well protected by massive city walls, the Republic of Ragusa used Pelješac to build another line of defence. At its narrowest point, just before it joins the mainland, a wall was built from Ston to Mali Ston. Throughout the era of the Republic, the walls were maintained and renovated once they meant to protect the precious salt pans that contributed to Dubrovnik's wealth, which are still being worked today.

It was built in the second half of the 14th century, with construction beginning in 1358, by the Dubrovnik Republic. It was meant to protect Pelješac and Ston, which were in their possession since the 1333 purchase from the Serbian Empire in return for the tribute of Ston.

Demolition work began on the walls following the fall of the Republic. Later the Austrian authorities took materials away from the wall to build schools and community buildings, and also for a triumphal arch on the occasion of the visit by the Austrian Emperor in 1884. The wall around Mali Ston was demolished with the excuse that it was damaging the health of the people. The demolition was halted after World War II.

=== Layout ===
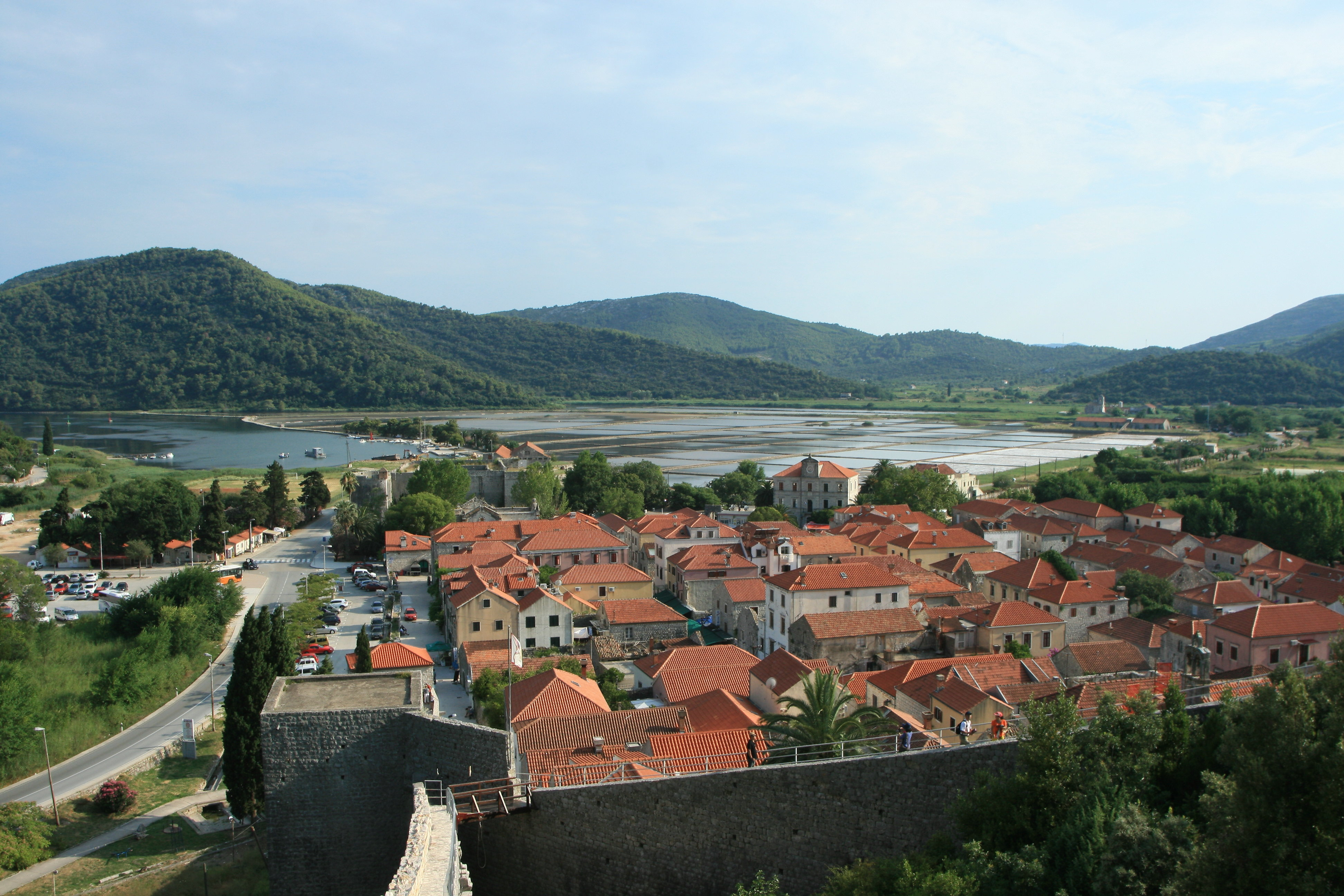
Walled town of Ston

The wall, today 5.5 kilometres long, links Ston to Mali Ston, and is in the shape of an irregular pentangle. It was completed in the 15th century, along with its 40 towers (20 of which have survived) and 5 fortresses. Within, three streets were laid from north to south and three others from east to west. Thus, fifteen equal blocks were formed with 10 houses in each. Residential buildings around the edges. The Gothic Republic Chancellery and the Bishop's Palace are outstanding among the public buildings.

The main streets are 6 m wide (except the southern street which is 8 m wide) and the side streets are two m wide. The town was entered by two city gates: the Field Gate (Poljska vrata) has a Latin inscription and dates from 1506. The centres of the system are the fortress Veliki kaštio in Ston, Koruna in Mali Ston and the fortress on Podzvizd hill (224 m). Noted artist who work on the walls project are Michelozzo, Bernardino Gatti of Parma and Giorgio da Sebenico (Juraj Dalmatinac).

The city plan of Dubrovnik was used as a model for Ston, but since Ston was built on prepared terrain, that model was more closely followed than Dubrovnik itself.

== Trivia ==
Ian Plummer (USA) currently holds the world record for fastest run over the wall connecting Ston to Mali Ston. The record was set on June 15, 2019. While the female record was set by Cora Taylor (UK) on July 8, 2019.

== See also ==
- Ston
- Walls of Dubrovnik
- List of cities with defensive walls
- List of castles in Croatia
- Tentative list of World Heritage Sites in Croatia
