= Česvinica =

- Settlement
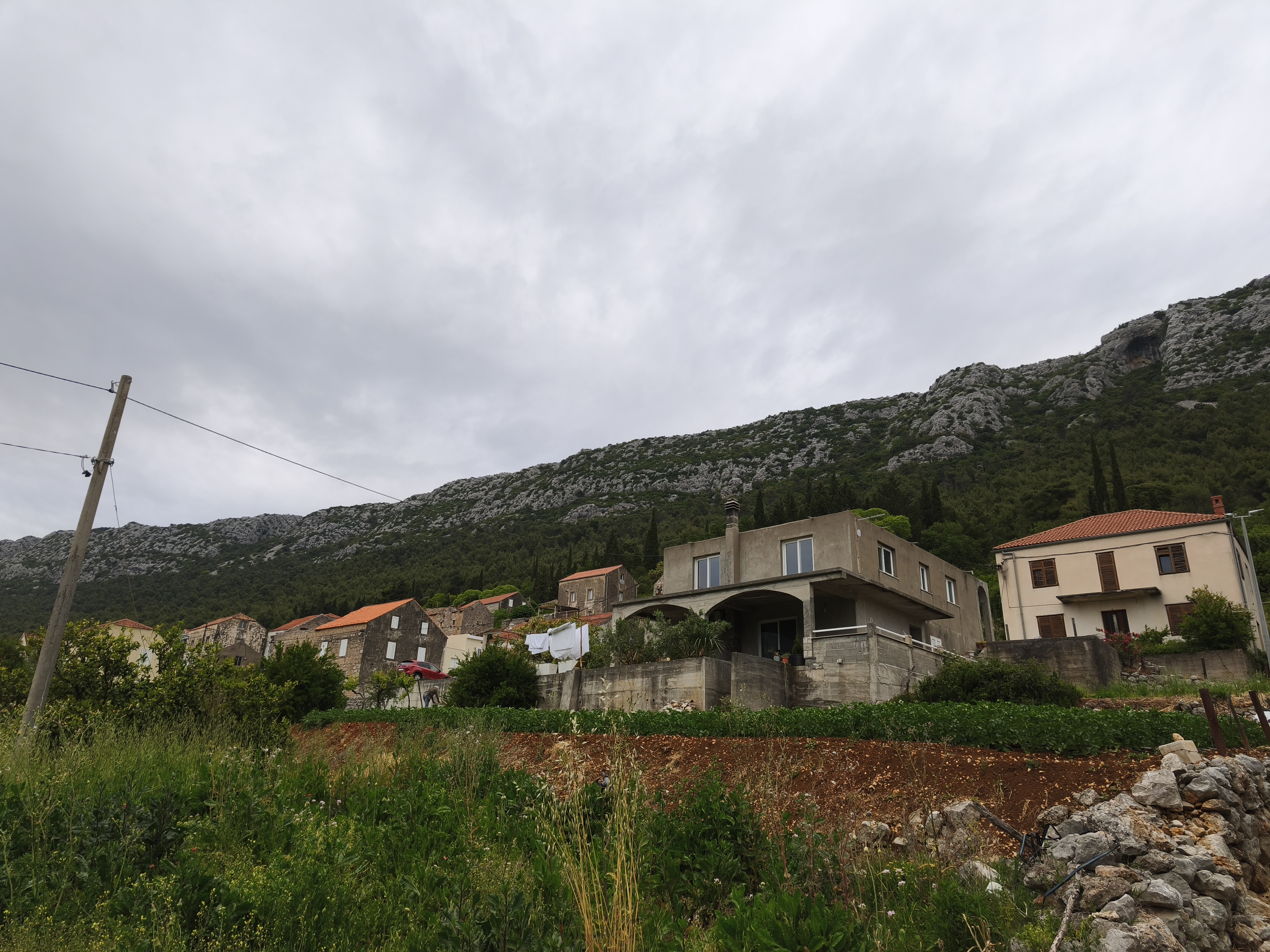

- Location within Croatia
- Country: Croatia
- County: Dubrovnik-Neretva County
- Municipality: Ston

Area
  - Total: 3.2 sq mi (8.2 km^{2})

Population (2021)
  - Total: 41
  - Density: 13/sq mi (5.0/km^{2})
- Time zone: UTC+1 (CET)
  - Summer (DST): UTC+2 (CEST)
- Postal code: 20230 Ston

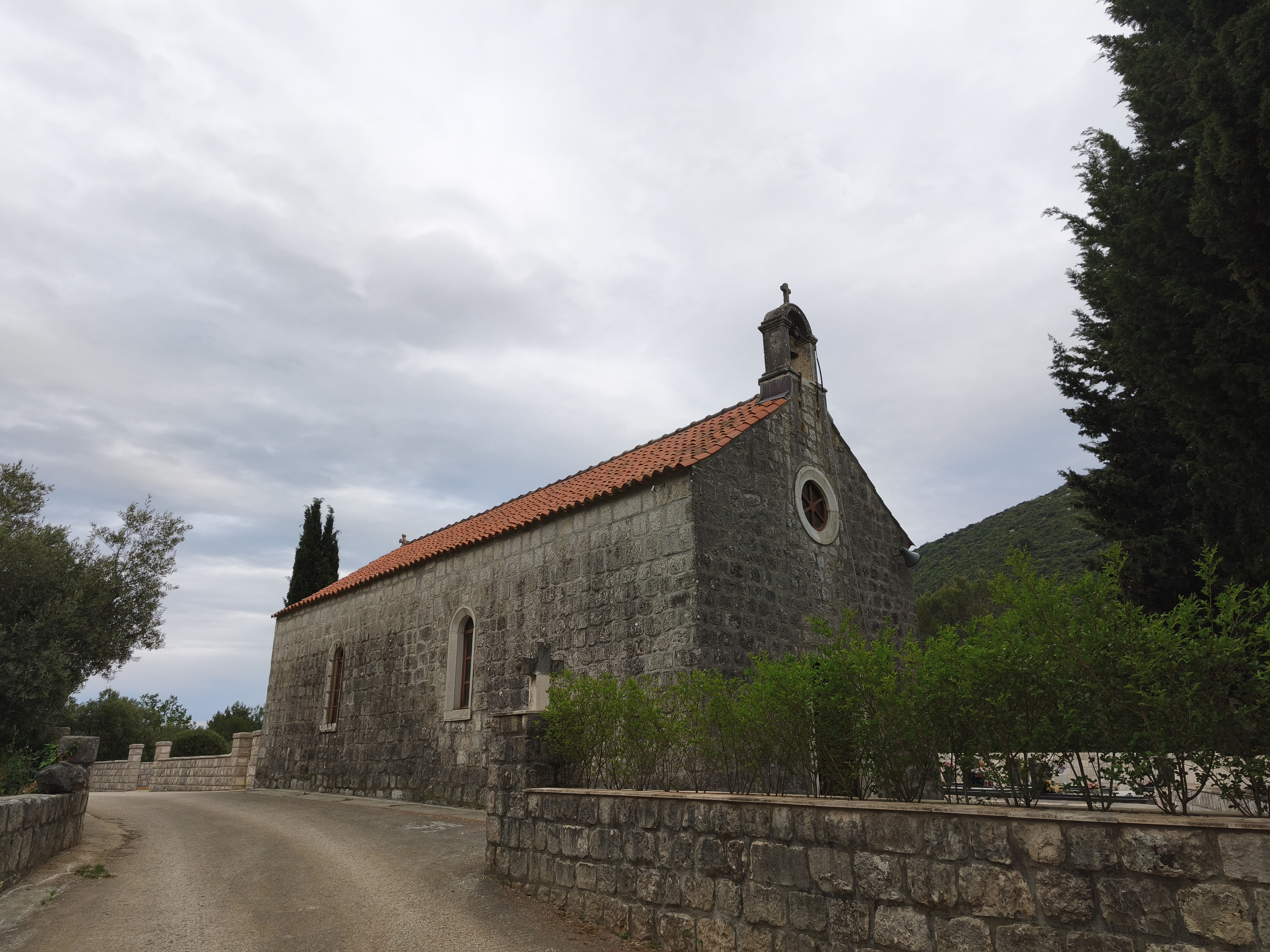
Church od St. Nicholas in Česvinica

Česvinica is a village in the municipality of Ston, Croatia.

== Demographics ==
According to the 2021 census, its population was 41. It was 55 in 2011.
