= Katič (disambiguation) =

Katič may refer to:

- Katič, an islet on the Adriatic Sea, in Montenegrin municipality of Budva
- Andreja Katič, Slovenian politician

== See also ==
- Katić
