= Brijesta =

- Settlement
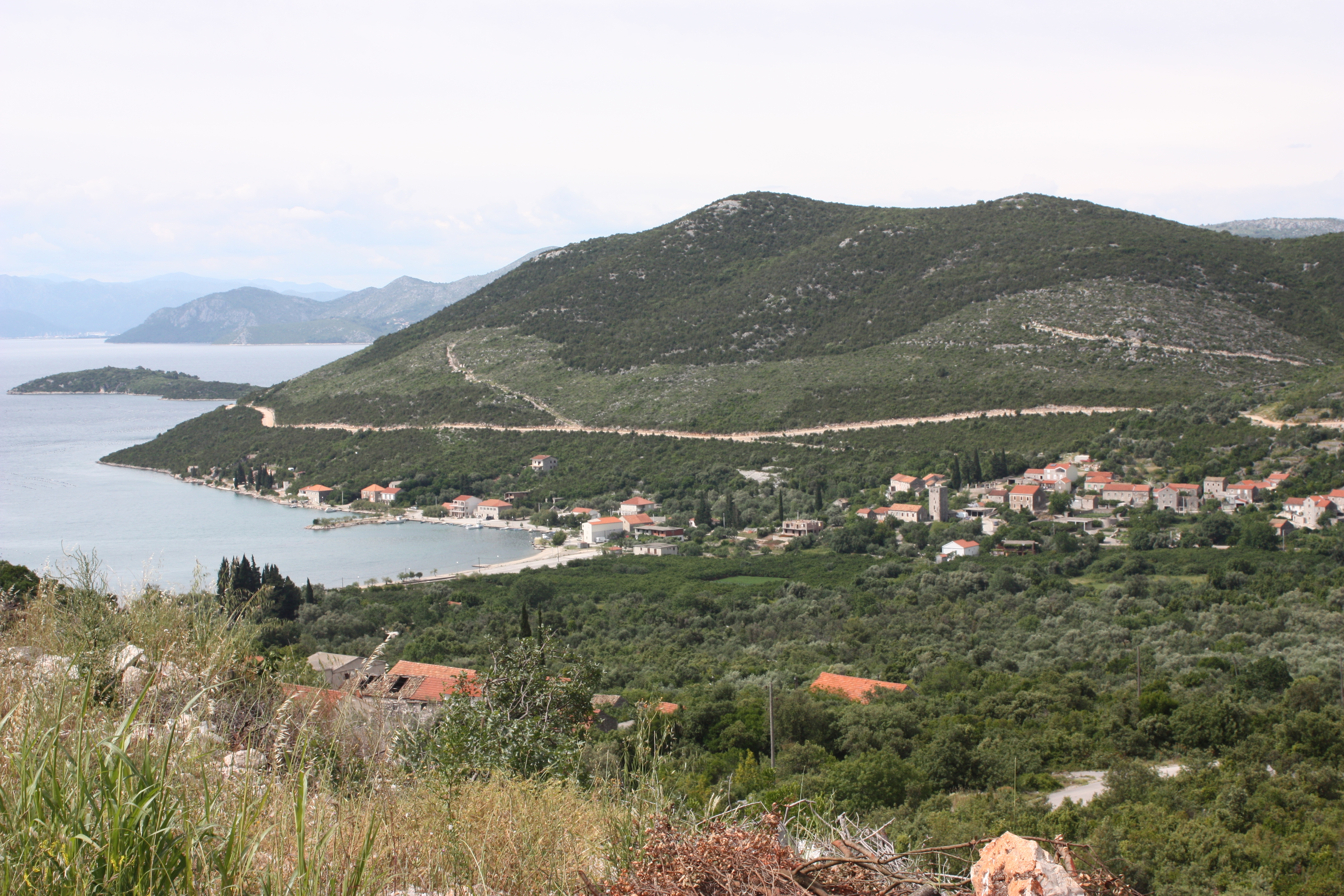

- Location within Croatia
- Country: Croatia
- County: Dubrovnik-Neretva County
- Municipality: Ston

Area
  - Total: 5.3 sq mi (13.7 km^{2})

Population (2021)
  - Total: 165
  - Density: 31.2/sq mi (12.0/km^{2})
- Time zone: UTC+1 (CET)
  - Summer (DST): UTC+2 (CEST)
- Postal code: 20230 Ston

Brijesta is a village in the municipality of Ston, Croatia.

== Demographics ==
According to the 2021 census, the village population was 165, having risen from 58 in 2011. The beautiful coastline and small islets are good for swimming and fishing.
