= Zabrđe, Croatia =

Zabrđe
- Settlement
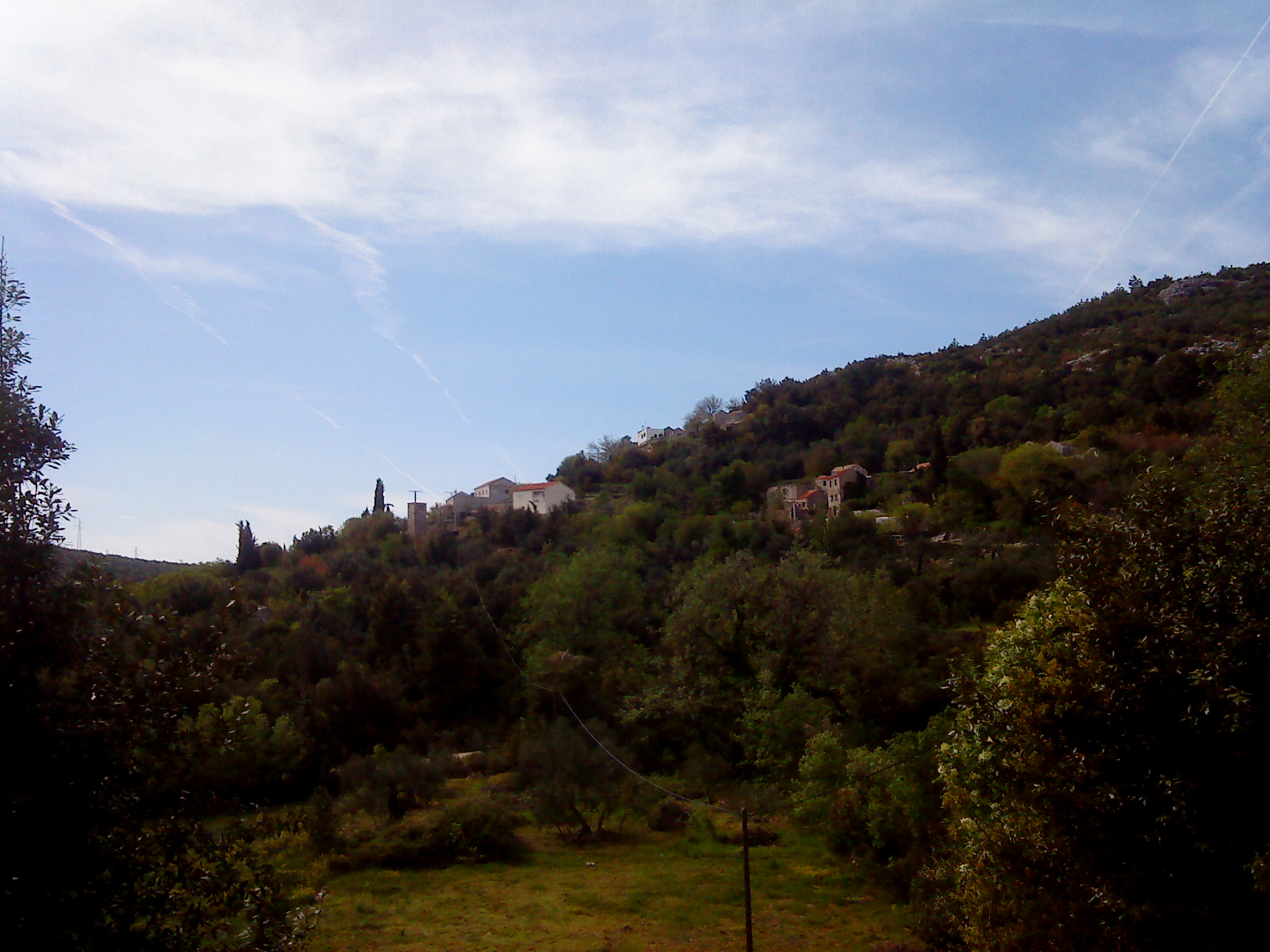

- Location within Croatia
- Coordinates: 42.8644584°N 17.5437508°E
- Country: Croatia
- County: Dubrovnik-Neretva County
- Municipality: Ston

Area
  - Total: 4.0 sq mi (10.4 km^{2})

Population (2021)
  - Total: 42
  - Density: 10/sq mi (4.0/km^{2})
- Time zone: UTC+1 (CET)
  - Summer (DST): UTC+2 (CEST)
- Postal code: 20230 Ston

Zabrđe is a village in Croatia. The village is situated on the Pelješac peninsula.

== Demographics ==
According to the 2021 census, its population was 42.
