= Duba Stonska =

- Settlement
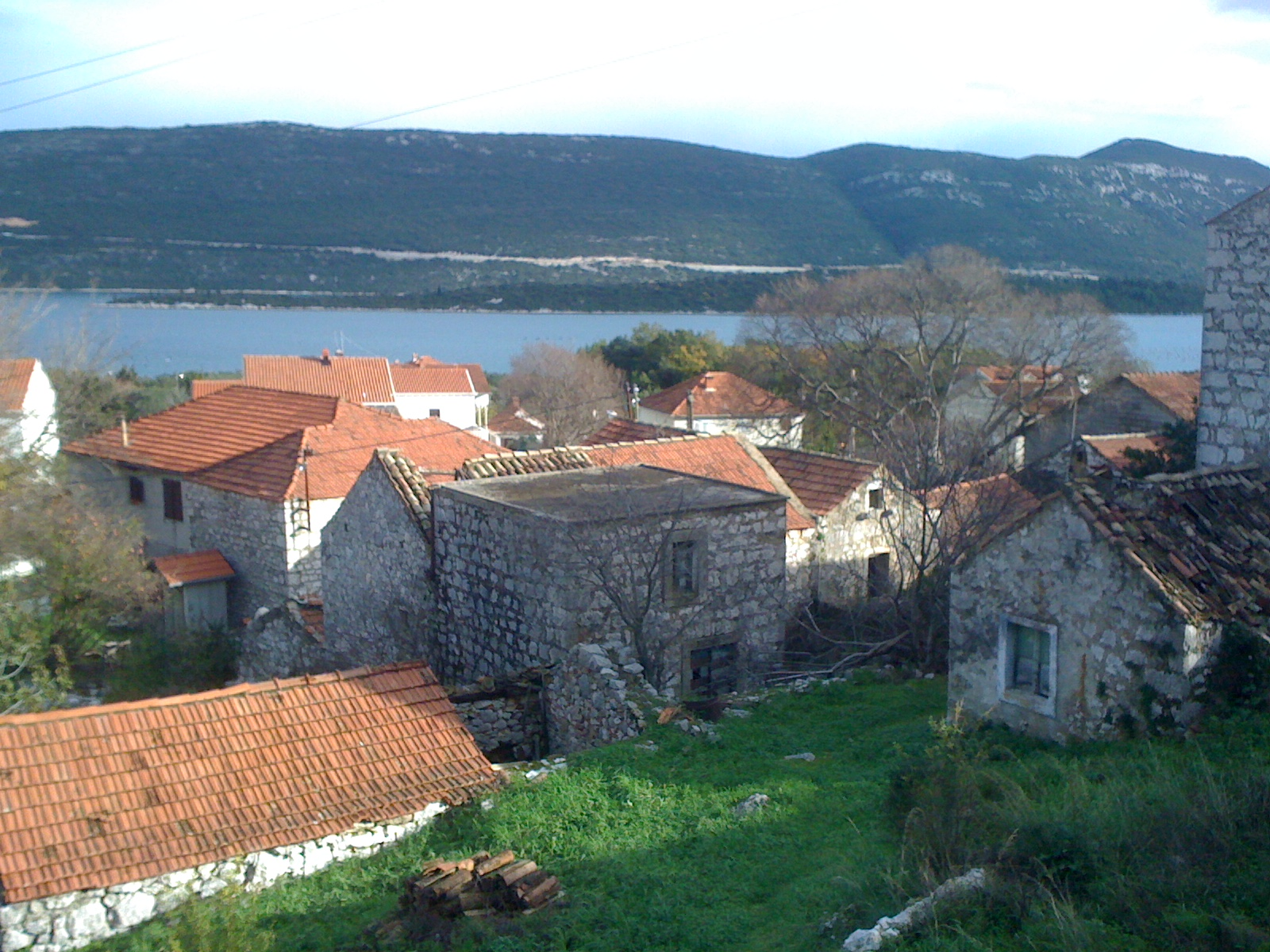

- Location within Croatia
- Country: Croatia
- County: Dubrovnik-Neretva County
- Municipality: Ston

Area
  - Total: 2.3 sq mi (5.9 km^{2})

Population (2021)
  - Total: 64
  - Density: 28/sq mi (11/km^{2})
- Time zone: UTC+1 (CET)
  - Summer (DST): UTC+2 (CEST)
- Postal code: 20230 Ston

Duba Stonska is a village in the municipality of Ston, Croatia.

== Demographics ==
According to the 2021 census, its population was 64. It was 36 in 2011.
