= Zamaslina =

- Settlement
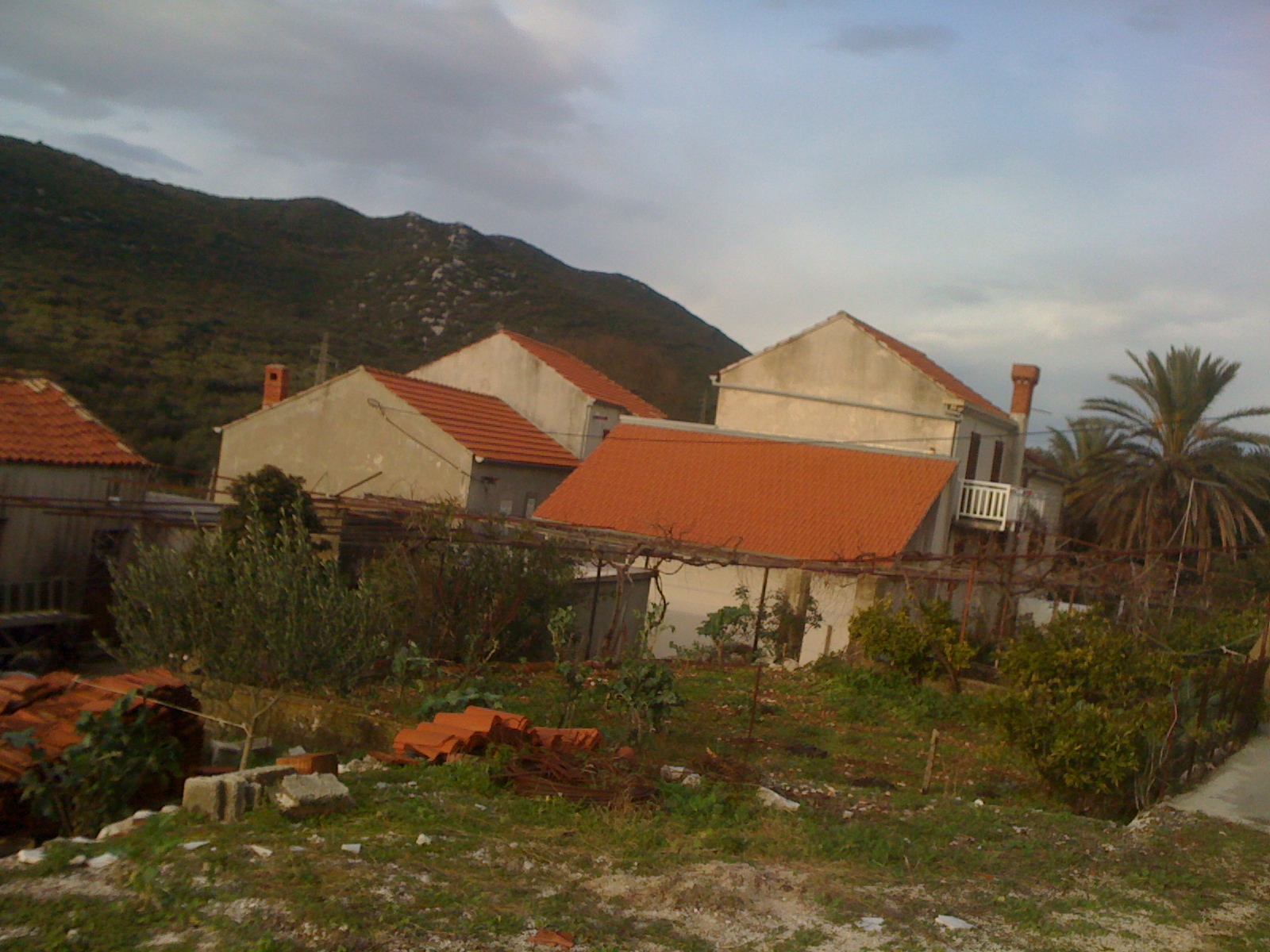

- Location within Croatia
- Coordinates: 42.831751°N 17.730424°E
- Country: Croatia
- County: Dubrovnik-Neretva County
- Municipality: Ston

Area
  - Total: 2.6 sq mi (6.8 km^{2})

Population (2021)
  - Total: 70
  - Density: 27/sq mi (10/km^{2})
- Time zone: UTC+1 (CET)
  - Summer (DST): UTC+2 (CEST)
- Postal code: 20230 Ston
- Area code: 020

Zamaslina is a village in Croatia. The village is situated on the Pelješac peninsula.

== Demographics ==
According to the 2021 census, its population was 70.
