= Mali Ston =

- Settlement
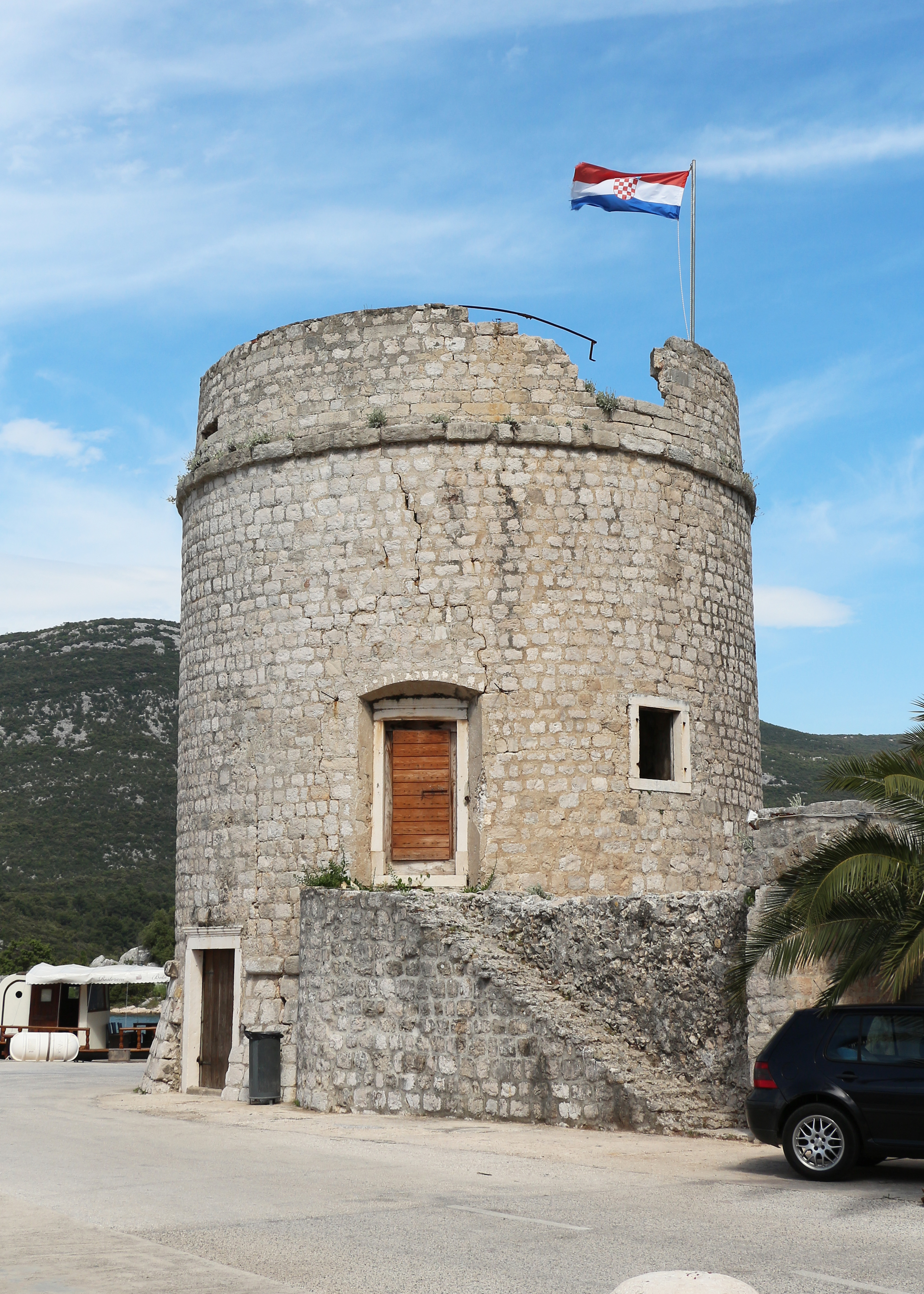
- Toljevac tower in Mali Ston
- Interactive map of Mali Ston
- Location within Croatia
- Country: Croatia
- County: Dubrovnik-Neretva County
- Municipality: Ston

Area
  - Total: 0.77 sq mi (2.0 km^{2})

Population (2021)
  - Total: 125
  - Density: 160/sq mi (62/km^{2})
- Time zone: UTC+1 (CET)
  - Summer (DST): UTC+2 (CEST)
- Postal code: 20230 Ston

Mali Ston (which means Little Ston) is a village in Croatia on the Pelješac peninsula approximately one kilometer northeast of its larger sister village, Ston.

It's linked to Ston by the Walls of Ston and is less than an hour northwest of Dubrovnik via the D414 highway. With its location on the Bay of Mali Ston, the village is well known for oyster production.

Mali Ston is known for its excellent seafood, primarily sea shell cuisine.

== Demographics ==
According to the 2021 census, its population was 125. It was 139 in 2011.

== Gallery ==
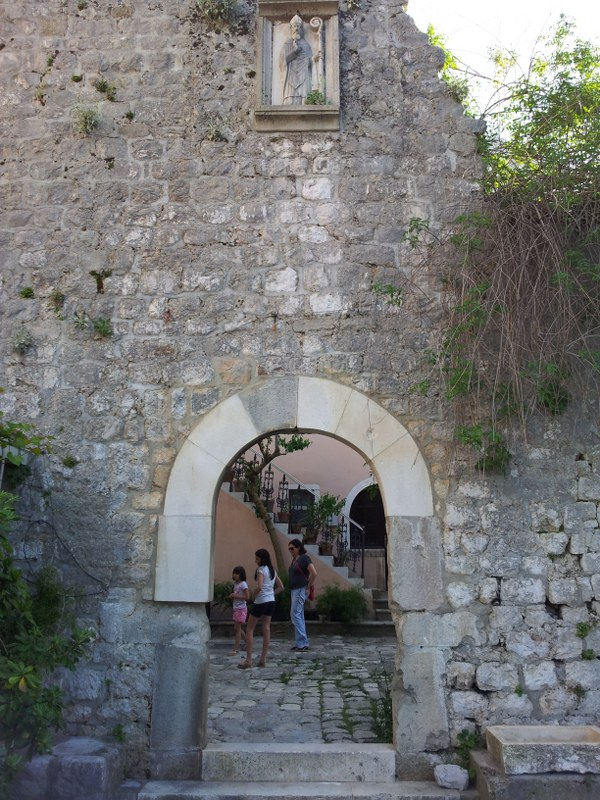
Entrance to Mali Ston City Walls in Croatia

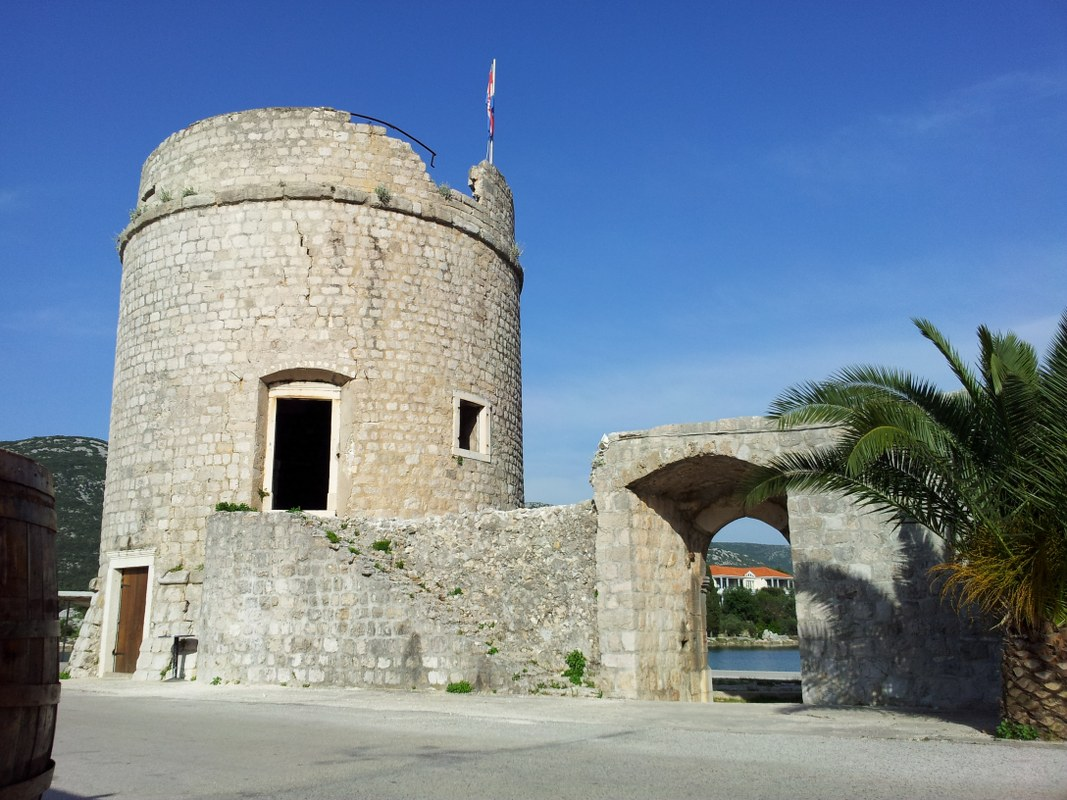
Mali Ston port
