= Tomislavovac =

- Settlement
- Location within Croatia
- Country: Croatia
- County: Dubrovnik-Neretva County
- Municipality: Ston

Area
  - Total: 4.6 sq mi (11.8 km^{2})

Population (2021)
  - Total: 147
  - Density: 32.3/sq mi (12.5/km^{2})
- Time zone: UTC+1 (CET)
  - Summer (DST): UTC+2 (CEST)
- Postal code: 20230 Ston

Tomislavovac is a village in the municipality of Ston, Croatia.

== Demographics ==
According to the 2021 census, its population was 147. It was 104 in 2011.
