= Dančanje =

- Settlement
- Location within Croatia
- Country: Croatia
- County: Dubrovnik-Neretva County
- Municipality: Ston

Area
  - Total: 3.5 sq mi (9.1 km^{2})

Population (2021)
  - Total: 31
  - Density: 8.8/sq mi (3.4/km^{2})
- Time zone: UTC+1 (CET)
  - Summer (DST): UTC+2 (CEST)
- Postal code: 20230 Ston

Dančanje is a village in the municipality of Ston, Croatia.

== Demographics ==
According to the 2021 census, its population was 31. It was 27 in 2011.
