= Gorno Čičevo =

Gorno Čičevo Горно Чичево
- Village
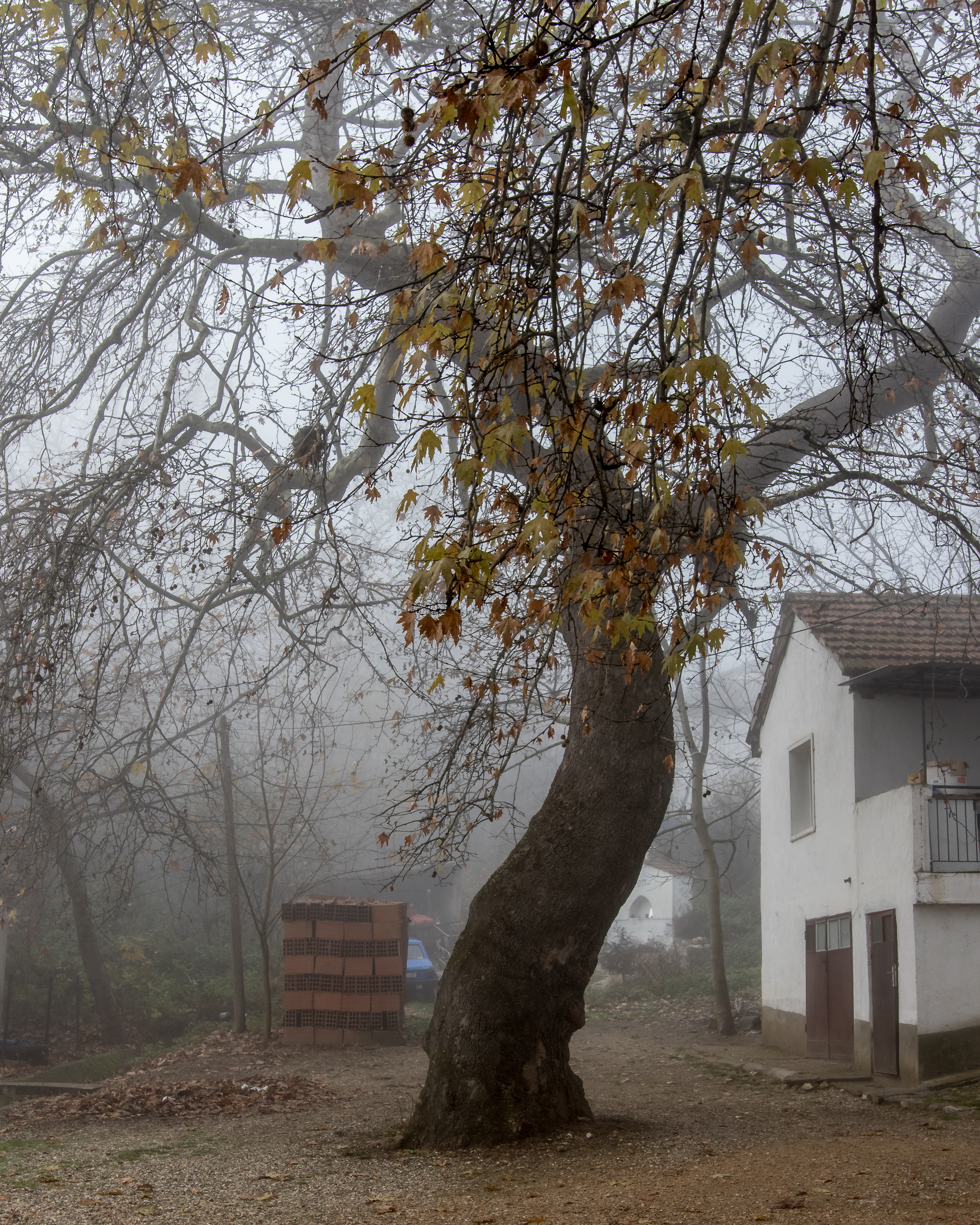

- Location within North Macedonia
- Coordinates: 41°40′N 21°52′E
- Country: North Macedonia
- Region: Vardar
- Municipality: Gradsko

Population (2021)
  - Total: 10
- Time zone: UTC+1 (CET)
  - Summer (DST): UTC+2 (CEST)
- Car plates: VE
- Website: .

Gorno Čičevo (Macedonian: Горно Чичево) is a village in the municipality of Gradsko, North Macedonia.

== Demographics ==
As of the 2021 census, Gorno Čičevo had 10 residents with the following ethnic composition:

- Macedonians 9
- Albanians 1
