= Glavinić =

Glavinić (Serbian Cyrillic: Главинић) is a Serbo-Croatian family name. Notable people with this name include:

- Sebastijan Glavinić (1632–1697), Croatian Roman Catholic bishop
- Thomas Glavinic (1972), Austrian writer
