= Ston =

Ston Općina Ston Municipality of Ston
- Municipality
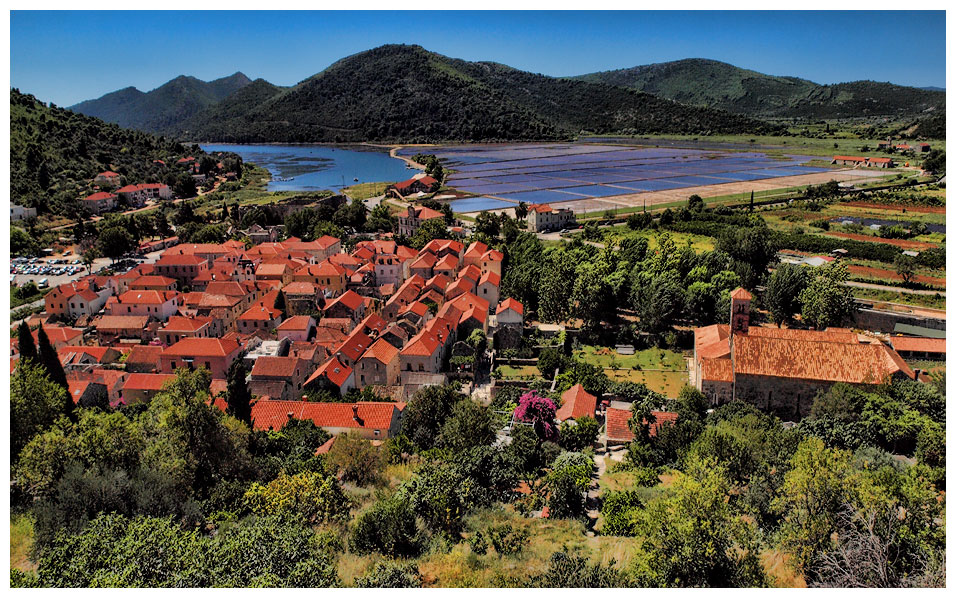
- Ston
- Interactive map of Ston
- Location within Croatia
- Coordinates: 42°50′N 17°42′E
- Country: Croatia
- County: Dubrovnik-Neretva County

Government
  - Mayor: Vedran Antunica

Area
  - Municipality: 65.1 sq mi (168.7 km^{2})
  - Urban: 3.0 sq mi (7.8 km^{2})
- Elevation: 0 ft (0 m)

Population (2021)
  - Municipality: 2,491
  - Density: 38.24/sq mi (14.77/km^{2})
  - Urban: 500
  - Urban density: 170/sq mi (64/km^{2})
- Time zone: UTC+1 (CET)
  - Summer (DST): UTC+2 (CEST)
- Postal code: 20 230
- Area code: +385 20
- Vehicle registration: DU
- Website: opcinaston.hr

Ston (pronounced [stôn]) is a settlement and a municipality in the Dubrovnik-Neretva County of Croatia, located at the south of isthmus of the Pelješac peninsula.

== History ==
Because of its geopolitical and strategic position, Ston has had a rich history since ancient times. Located at the gates of the peninsula, surrounded by three seas, protected by four hills, rich in fresh water and saltwater, fertile plains, it has been an important political, cultural and ecclesiastical centre.

Initially it was an Illyrian settlement until the Romans established their own colony there, in 167 BC.

In 533, at Salona, a diocese of Sarsenterum was established for the Zachlumia (Hum) area, which belonged to the church in Ston (Pardui). Later Sarsenterum was destroyed, most likely at the time of the Avars' campaign. Since Ston was not reached by the Avars, it was spared and became the seat of the local župa.

Upon the arrival of the South Slavs in the 7th century, the area of the Neretva (from the northern Herzegovina mountains to Rijeka Dubrovačka) was organized as the principality of Zachlumia - same as Neretva, Primorje and Zahulje, which also belonged to Ston with Rat (Pelješac) and Mljet. Local rulers acknowledged the supremacy of the Byzantine Empire.

As the secular and ecclesial powers grew, it is assumed that after the disappearance of Sarsenterum, Ston became a local ecclesiastical center. The diocese of Ston is first mentioned in 877, as an institution from an earlier time, and the bishop is listed as a suffragan of the metropolis of Split.

After Mihailo Višević, who ruled Zachlumia in the 10th century and acknowledged the authority of the Bulgarian Emperor Simeon, the territory was ruled over by different dynasties. Around 950, it was briefly ruled by the Serbian Prince Časlav. At the end of the 10th century, Samuilo was the Lord of Zachlumia, and the dukedom belonged to the Prince of Duklja, Jovan Vladimir.

With the establishment of the Archdiocese of Ragusa (Dubrovnik) in 1120, Ston became a suffragan of the latter.

In 1168, Duklja and Zachlumia were conquered by the Serbian Grand Prince, Stefan Nemanja. Thirty years later, Zachlumia was invaded by Andrija, the Duke of Croatia and Dalmatia.

The old Ston was located on the slopes of the hills of Gorica and St. Michael, south of the Ston field. There were several early Christian churches, the largest of which was St. Stephen's Church. The bishopric church of Mary Magdalene stood until it was bombed by the Allies in 1944. The only church that still remains is the church of St. Michael, built in the middle of the late antique castrum.

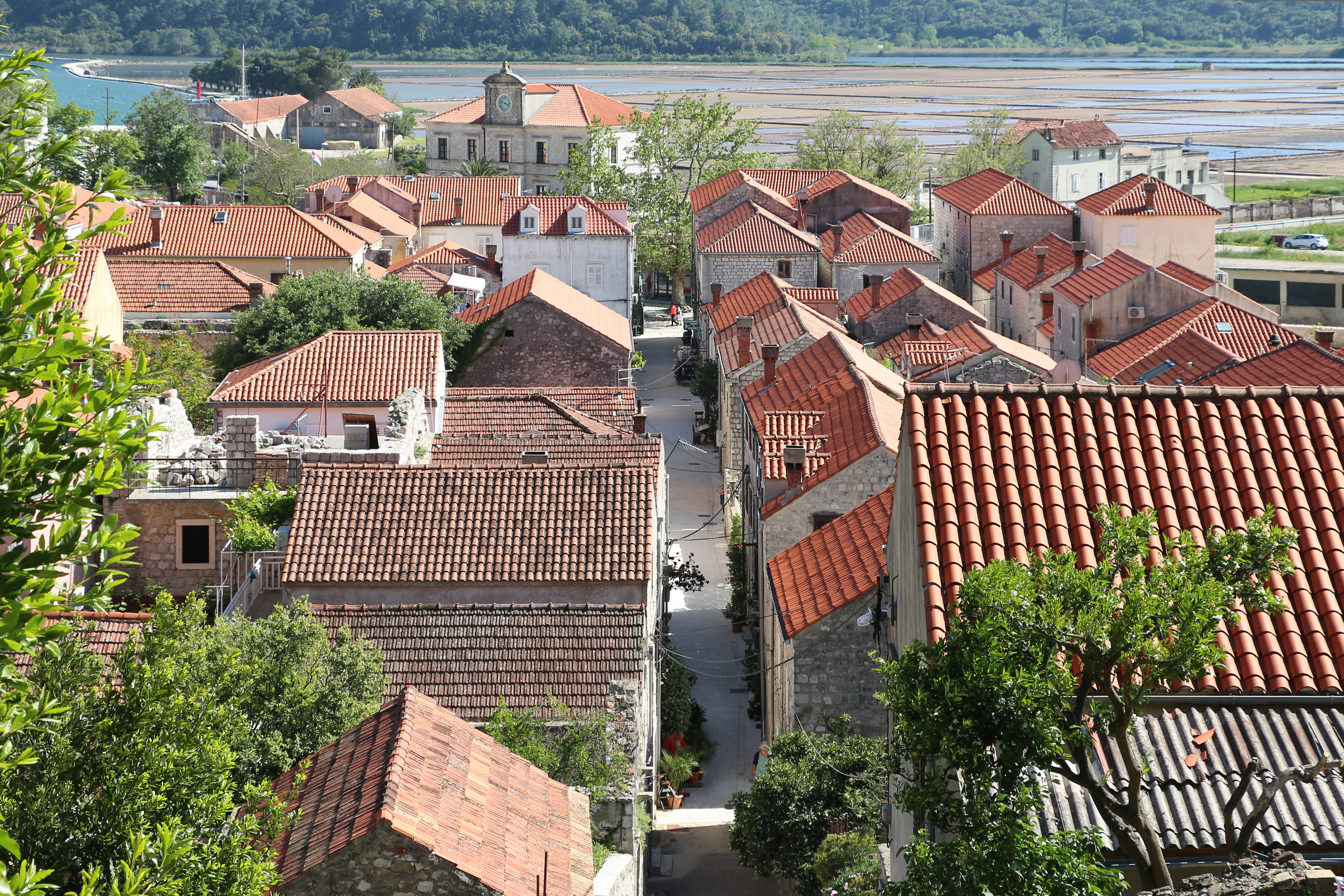
View of Ston

In 1219, Saint Sava of Serbia, the first Archbishop of the Serbian Church, who briefly ruled as Prince of Hum, held the title "Archbishop of all Serbian and Maritime Lands." He founded the Monastery of the Holy Mother of God in Dalmatia at Ston, as a seat of the Eparchy of Hum, one of the eparchies of the Serbian Orthodox Church.

The original old town was demolished in the earthquake of 1252. With the arrival of the Republic, a new city was built on today's location. When renovations were made at the church of St. Michael at the top of the hill, fragments of Roman decorative plaster, Roman tombstones and antique ceramics were found, confirming this assumption. According to some sources, Ston experienced a destructive civil war in 1250, and in these conflicts the city suffered a great deal of destruction.

In 1254, Béla IV of Hungary conquered Bosnia and Zachlumia. The turbulent times at the beginning of the 14th century spread across the entire country of Zahumlje. From 1304, Zachlumia was ruled by Mladen II Šubić, then again for a short period by a Serbian župan, and then became part of the medieval Bosnian state, acquired by Stjepan Kotromanić in 1325.

The aggressive politics by the Branivojević brothers, forced the people of Dubrovnik to fight them in 1326 with the help of Stjepan II Kotromanić. That year, Dubrovnik occupied Ston. The Dubrovnik people immediately began to build and establish a new Ston, to defend the Pelješac and protect the slaves from which they had earned big revenue. Since the conflict between the Bosnian Ban and the Serbian vassal in Zahumlje, Dubrovnik purchased Pelješac with Ston from rulers of Serbia and Bosnia in 1333, in return for paying the so-called tribute of Ston.

The first cathedral was that of St. Mary Magdalene in Gorica. The church of Our Lady of Lužina was built in the 10th century. The cathedral of St. Blaise was built in 1342 by decision of the Senate after Ston joined the Republic of Ragusa, on the site of the present damaged parish church. From then on, Ston was an integral part of the Republic until its fall, and was its second most important city.

In 1333, Dubrovnik began the planned construction of the fortresses of Ston (Croatian: Veliki Ston) and Little Ston (Croatian: Mali Ston) on the present site. The cladding between the two towns along their entire length consisted of large walls which were supposed to defend Pelješac. This whole complex of fortifications, unique in Europe, was built in a short period of time.

The first Franciscan monastery in Ston was built in 1349; a female monastery was added in 1400. A Dominican convent was built in the nearby Broce in 1628.

The downfall of the Republic of Dubrovnik took place due to the sudden and often incomprehensible operations in the 19th century. The city walls of Little Ston were demolished to suppress malaria. The monumental stone fortification complex of Ston suddenly collapsed in preparation for the official visit by the Austrian Emperor, Franz Joseph - the stones became a quarry for nearby new outcrops and foundations. The restoration of the stone monuments and the reconstruction of the fortifications and the tower resumed only after 1945, however they were again damaged in the Croatian War of Independence (1991–1995), followed by the devastating earthquake of 1996. Recently, thanks to the Society of Friends of the Dubrovnik Walls, the stone forts and towers are being reconstructed, so that the monumental stonewall complex now begins to live again in its old dignity.

== Climate ==
Since records began in 1981, the highest temperature recorded at the local weather station was 41.5 °C (106.7 °F), on 4 August 1981. The coldest temperature was −9.1 °C (15.6 °F), on 19 January 2021.

== Demographics ==
According to the 2021 census, its population was 2,491, with 500 living in the town proper.

In the 2011 census, the total population of the municipality of Ston was 2,407, in the following settlements:

- Boljenovići, population 87
- Brijesta, population 58
- Broce, population 87
- Česvinica, population 55
- Dančanje, population 27
- Duba Stonska, population 36
- Dubrava, population 133
- Hodilje, population 190
- Luka, population 153
- Mali Ston, population 139
- Metohija, population 157
- Putniković, population 82
- Sparagovići, population 114
- Ston, population 549
- Tomislavovac, population 104
- Zabrđe, population 61
- Zamaslina, population 79
- Zaton Doli, population 61
- Žuljana, population 235

The small villages of Metohija, Sparagovići and Boljenovići form a larger village that is called Ponikve.

Ston: Population trends 1857–2021
v

population	3593	3548	3589	3842	4332	4288	4060	4045	3954	3972	3715	3283	2819	2802	2605	2407	2491
	1857	1869	1880	1890	1900	1910	1921	1931	1948	1953	1961	1971	1981	1991	2001	2011	2021

Sources: Croatian Bureau of Statistics publications

== Cultural monuments ==
=== Walls of Ston ===
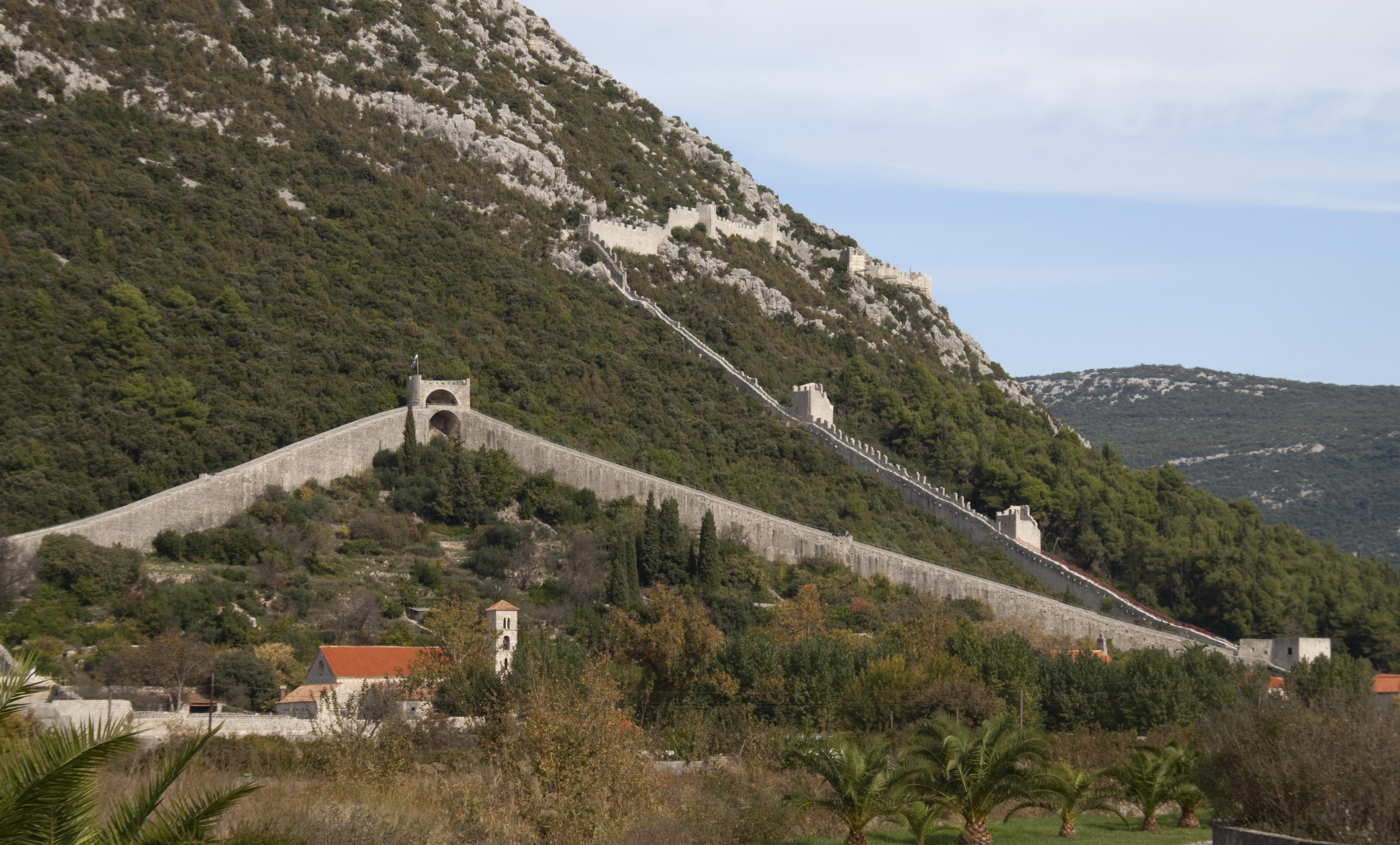
Walls of Ston

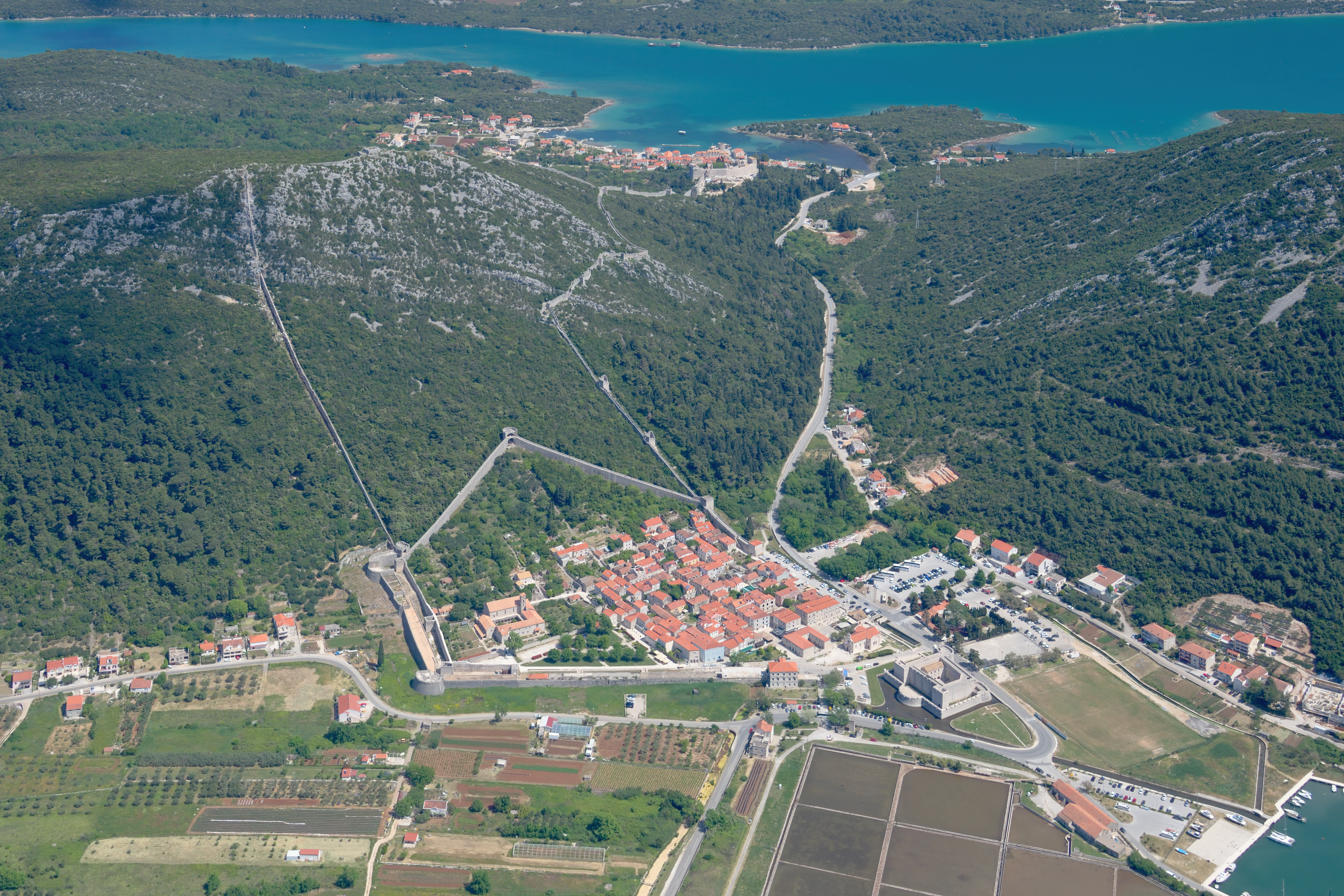
Ston, Mali Ston and the walls of Ston

After the Republic of Dubrovnik acquired the Pelješac in 1334, it required the protection of Ston. First, in thirty years, one of the longest defense walls in Europe was erected on one side of the peninsula, and according to a unique project, two new towns were planned: southern Ston and northern Little Ston with the aim of encompassing people to preserve the boundaries and work in solanas the state had acquired. Between 1461 and 1464, the Florentine architect Michelozzo commissioned the building of the wall by the order of the Dubrovnik Republic. The Great Wall is 1200 m long, and was built to ensure protection from neighbours. The chronicles state that the construction of the wall lasted for 18 months and cost 12,000 ducats.

The fortress of Ston was one of the largest construction projects of the time, with an original length of 7000 m, consisting of the walls of Ston and Little Ston. The Great Wall consists of three fortresses, and the walls and fortresses are flanked by 10 rounds of 31 squares and 6 semi-circular bastions. The complex defense corps has been shaped over the course of four centuries, due to the development of weapons.

The walls were of great importance because they were defending the saltworks that gave 15,900 ducats every year to the Dubrovnik Republic, the shellfish farm and the city itself.

In 1667, about 0.5 km of walls were destroyed in a catastrophic earthquake, and the walls were significantly damaged in the earthquakes in 1979 and 1996.

In 2004, work on the restoration of obsolete walls was started, with the aim of facilitating visits to the area between Ston and Little Ston. It was assumed that the works would be completed by May 2008, but only the original part of the Ston Bridge was rebuilt. The reconstruction of the Great Wall in Ston, worth about five million kuna (€673,000), was completed, and it was announced that the stone walls with public entrance fee will be opened in May 2009. Part of the wall is open to the public since October 2009 for a fee. Until 2013, the original part of the city, the road have been restored. It takes 15 minutes to get to the first part, and 30 minutes to get from the Great to the Small Wall. Today the greater part of the walls have been restored.

== See also ==
- Orebić

== Gallery ==
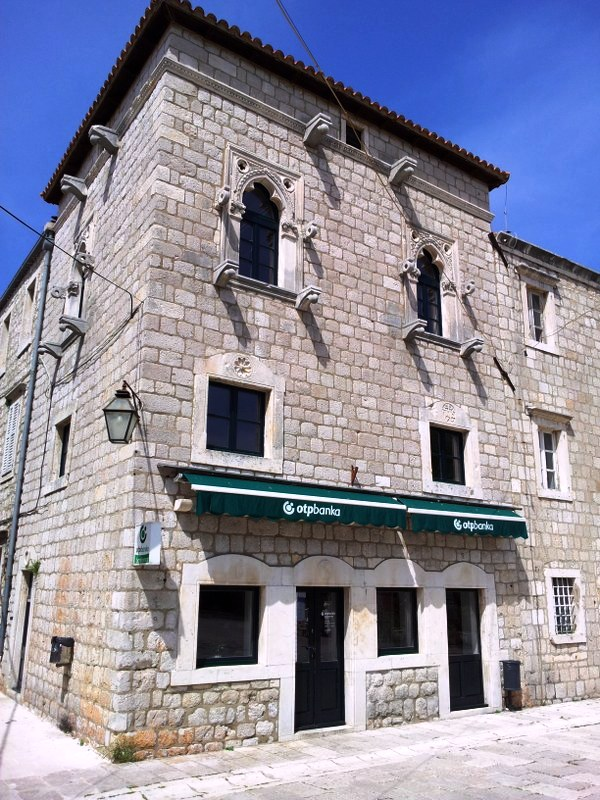
Street in Ston

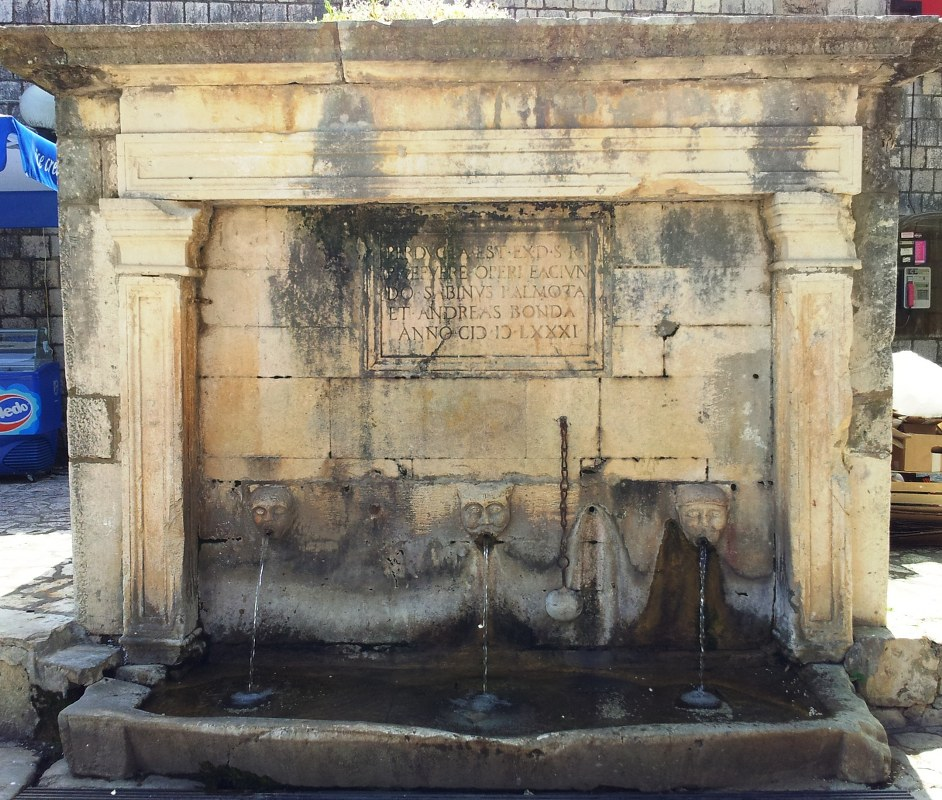
Fountain in the centre

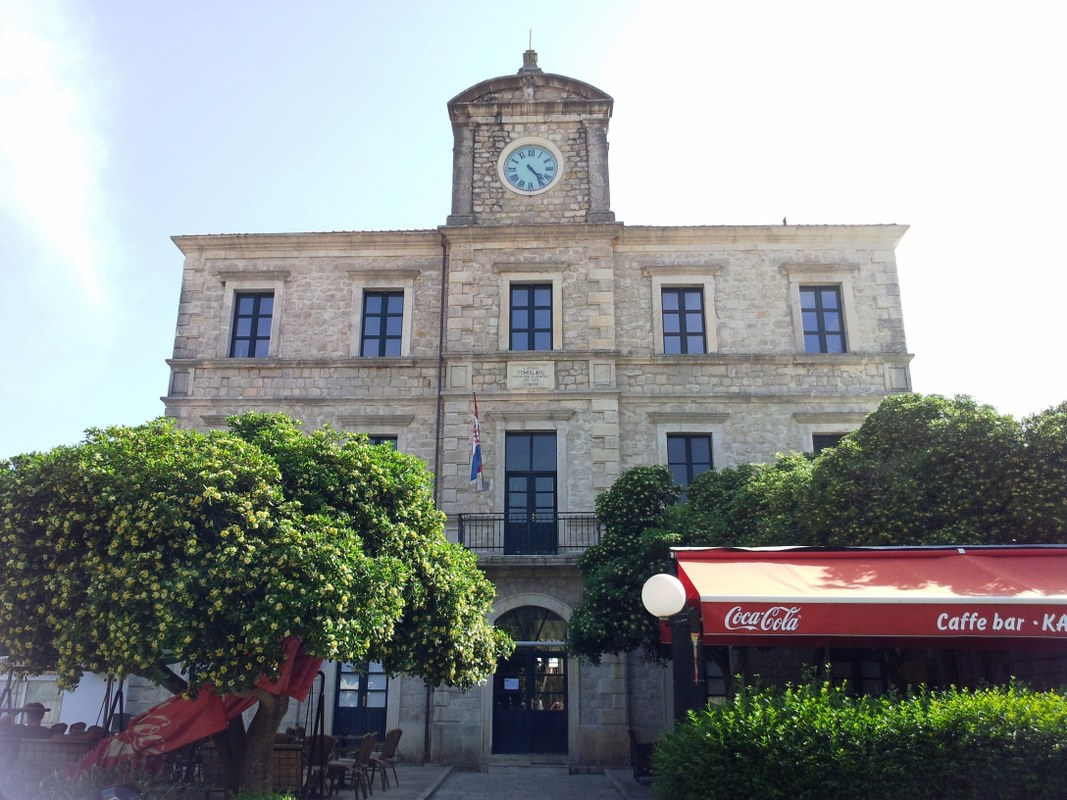
Ston Municipal Building

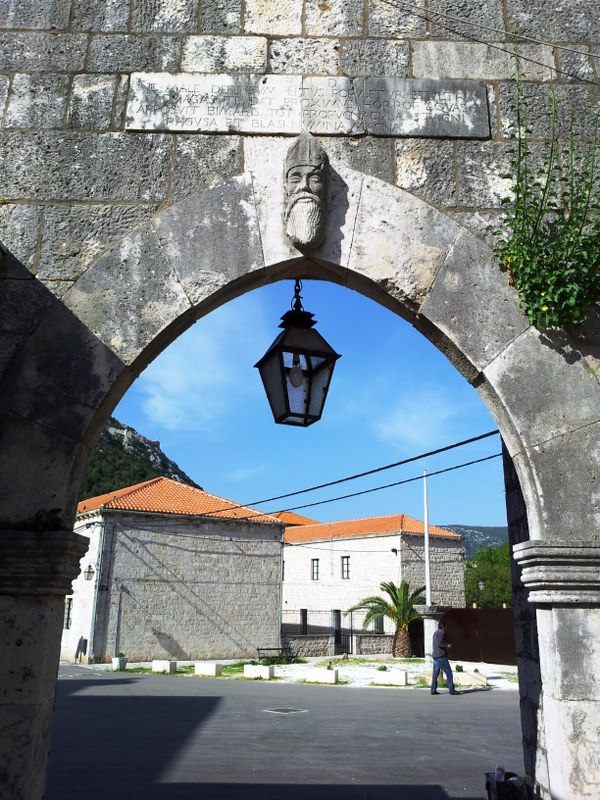
Entrance to Ston City Walls

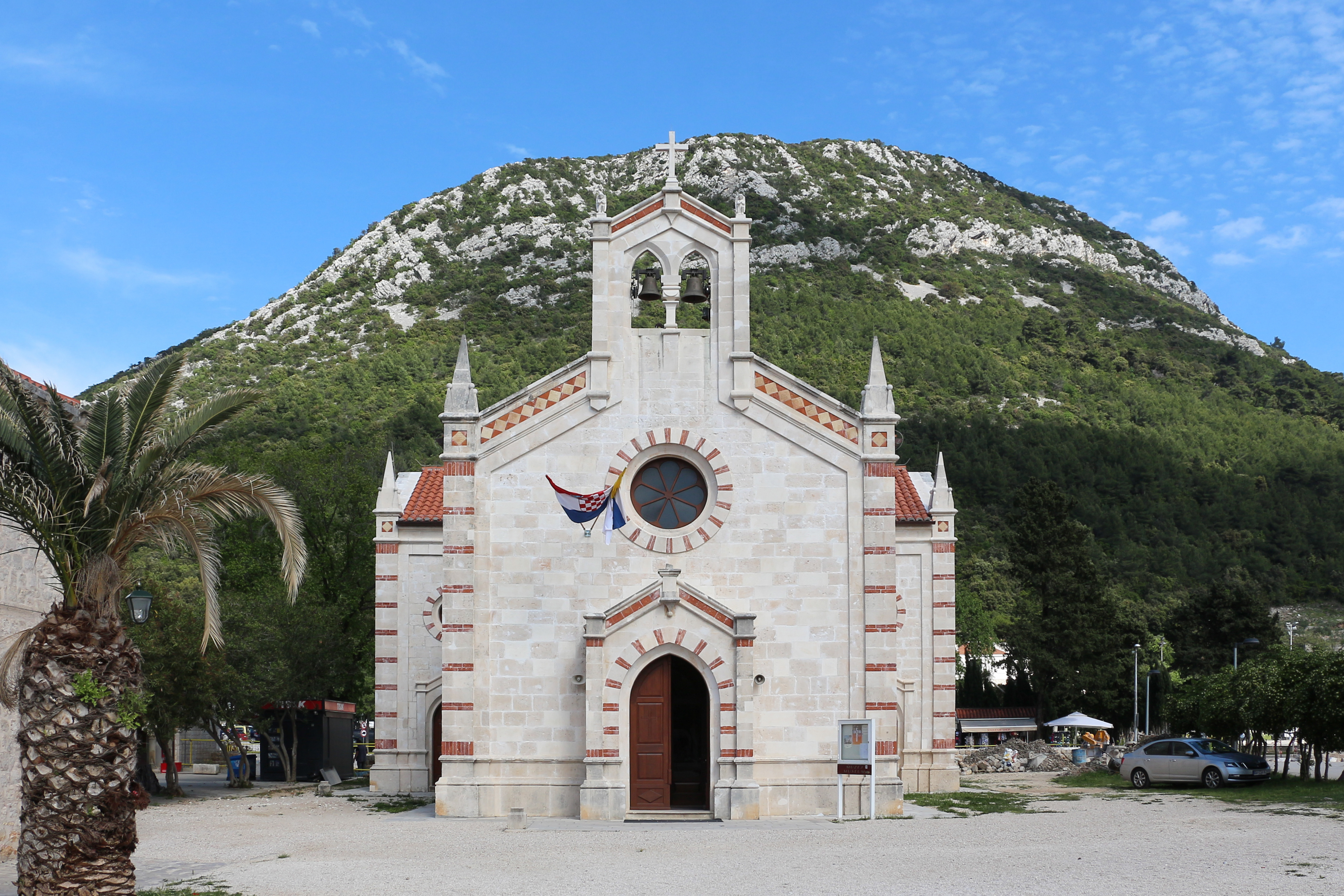
Church of St. Blaise

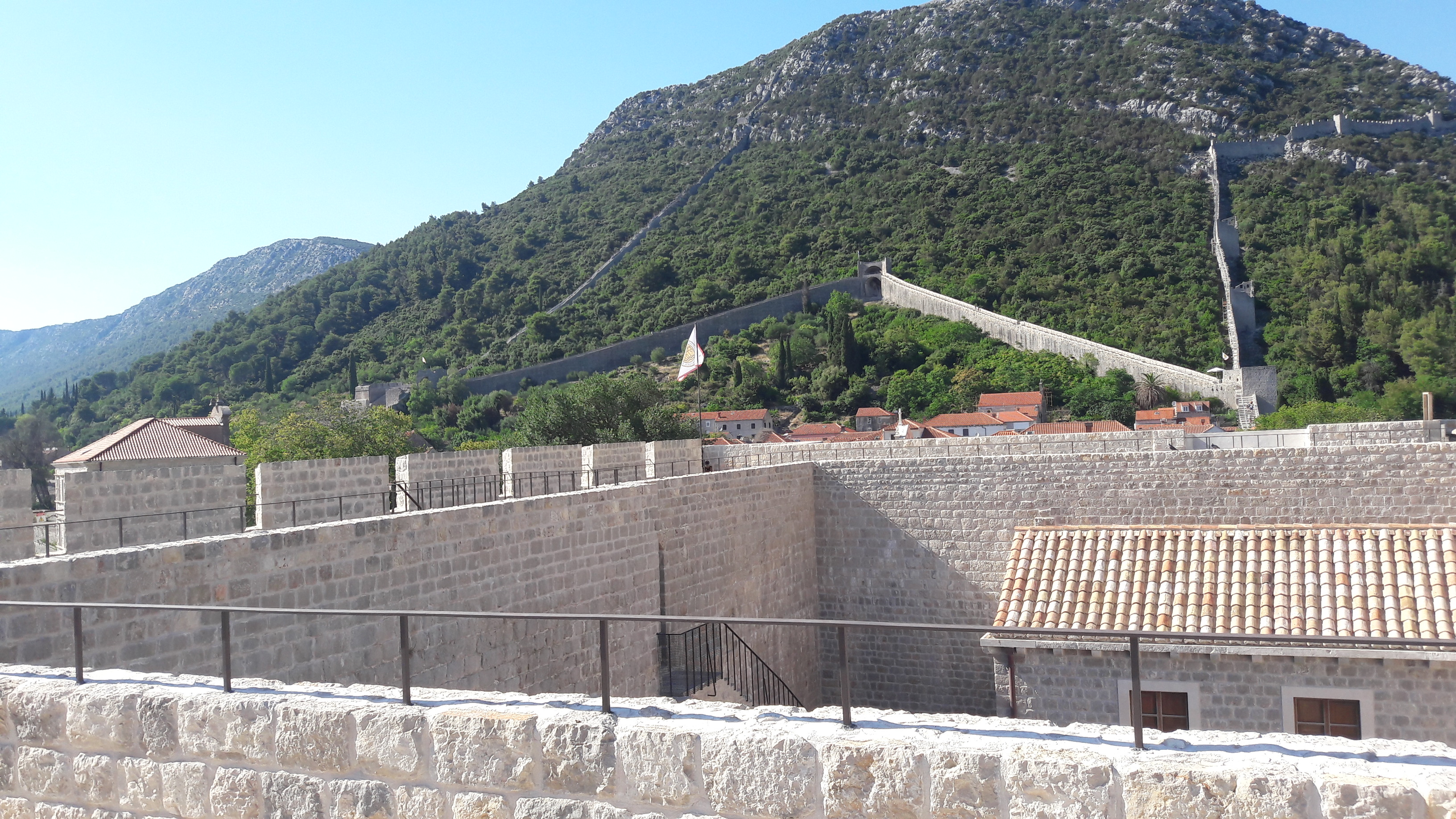
View from the Fort of Kaštio

== Sources ==
- Ćosić, Stjepan. “The Nobility of the Episcopal Town of Ston (Nobilitas civitatis episcopalis Stagnensis) Dubrovnik Annals, Vol. No. 5, 2001.
- Gudelj, Krešimira. “Coastal toponymy of the Ston region,” Folia onomastica Croatica, Vol. No. 20, 2011Melita Peharda, Mirjana Hrs-Brenko, Danijela Bogner, “Diversity of bivalve species in Mali Ston Bay, Adriatic Sea," Acta Adriatica, Vol. 45 No. 2, 2004.
- Lupis, Vinicije B., “Mediaeval crucifixes from Ston and its surrounding area,” Starohrvatska prosvjeta, Vol. III No. 38, 2011.
- Miović, Vesna. "Emin (Customs Officer) as Representative of the Ottoman Empire in the Republic of Dubrovnik," Dubrovnik Annals 7 (2003): pp. 81–88.
- Tomšić, Sanja, and Josip Lovrić. “Historical overview of oyster culture in Mali Ston Bay,” Naše more, Znanstveno-stručni časopis za more i pomorstvo, Vol. 51 No. 1-2, 2004.
- Andrej Žmegač. “The Ston Fortification Complex - Several Issues,” Prilozi povijesti umjetnosti u Dalmaciji, Vol. 39 No. 1, 2005
- Nikodim, Bishop of Dalmatia and Istria (1914). Ston u srednjim vijekovima. Nakl. piščeva.
