= Broce, Croatia =

Broce
- Settlement
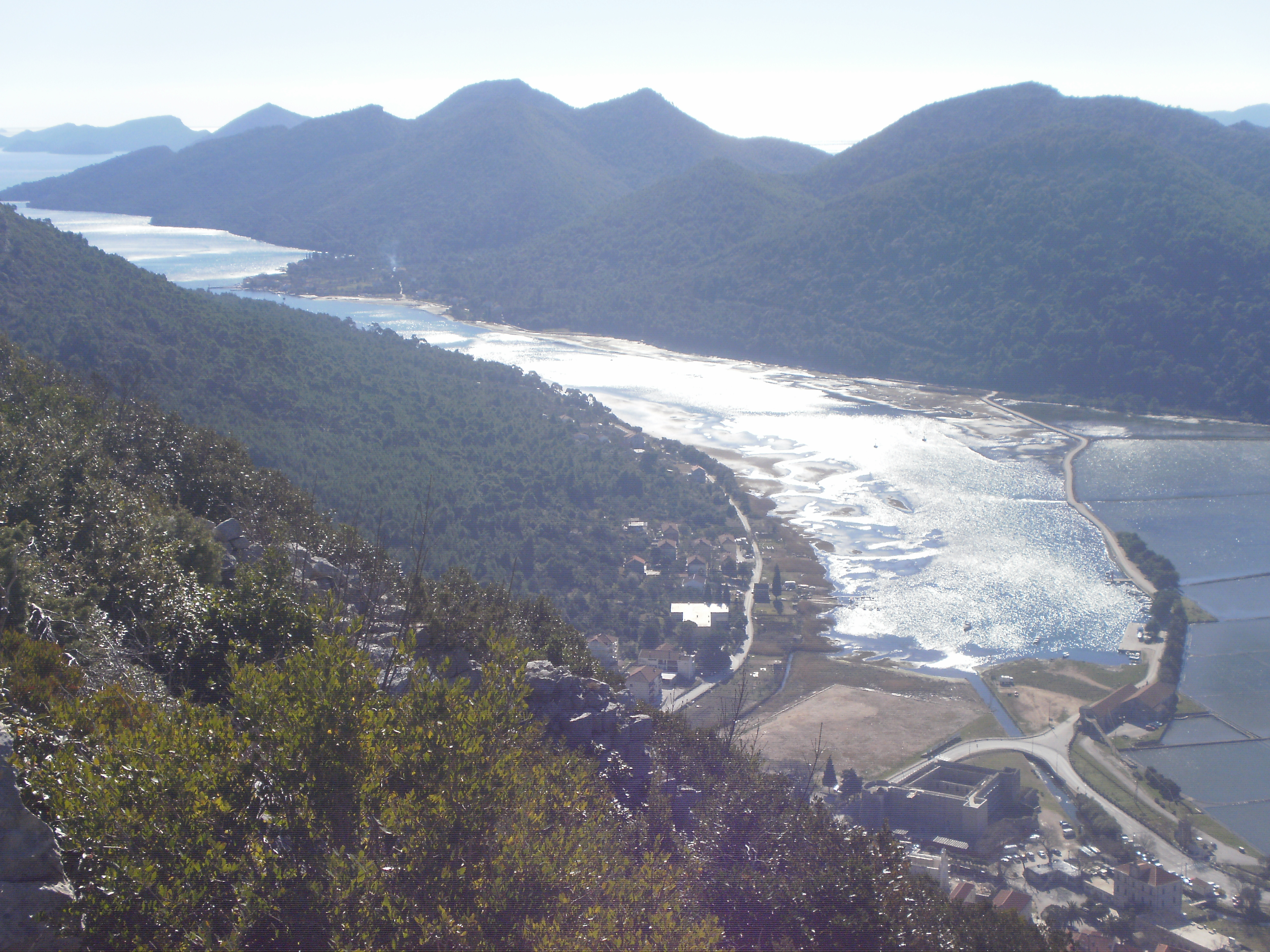
- Interactive map of Broce
- Location within Croatia
- Country: Croatia
- County: Dubrovnik-Neretva County
- Municipality: Ston

Area
  - Total: 5.0 sq mi (13.0 km^{2})

Population (2021)
  - Total: 90
  - Density: 18/sq mi (6.9/km^{2})
- Time zone: UTC+1 (CET)
  - Summer (DST): UTC+2 (CEST)
- Postal code: 20230 Ston

Broce is a village in the municipality of Ston, Croatia.

A Dominican convent in the village had been built in 1628.

== Demographics ==
According to the 2021 census, its population was 90. It was 87 in 2011.
