= Hramko =

Sramko (Serbian Cyrillic: Срамко, Archaic: Срамько) or Hramko, was a local Slavic nobleman from the region surrounding Trebinje, who ruled the area with a title knez. It is presumed that he has been active during dominance of the Nemanjić dynasty (1166–1371) in the region.

An inscription found by scholar Stevan Delić near the Church of St. Peter in the locality of Crnče near Trebinje reading:

Поʌєmɖ Дϸоɣгɖɴ н Дϸɖжєmɖ vнɴє ϸɖкоɣ ɴɖΔѣ ʍɖmєϸнɴо оɣ Δѣɴн сʌɖВѣɴɖ кɴєӡɖ Сϸɖʍѣкɖ

Poleta, Drougan and Dražeta buried their mother in the days of glorious Duke Sramko

(Полета, Дроугань, Дражета чине ракоу надь материю оу дьни славьна кнеза Срамька

The finding was published in 1913, after Delić had likely found it in the winter of 1912 or early 1913. Grave tablets were unearthed while digging the base for the new church. The grave tablet mentioning Sramko was unearthed by the western wall of the nave of the church, some 40 cm below surface, with a part of it set in the base of the church. The dimensions of the tablet were 130×80 cm. Vladimir Ćorović, writing in 1925, proposed that the unusual name Sramko was to be read as Hramko (Хϸɖʍѣко; Храмько). Marko Vego, too, read it as Hramko, and believed that he was an important person, even more so than Grd. Vego believed that he lived during the Nemanjić period, after ousting knez Mihailo from the Trebinje province.

In a Latin donation charter, a Chrance, rendered Hranko or Hramko, has been connected by some scholars to Sramko. The text mentions "The seal of Hranko and all župani of Zahumlje" (Sigillum Chrance cum omnibus suis iupanis Zacholmie). Ferdo Šišić however disputed this, as he regarded the donation charter a falsification as is generally held against several alleged 12th- and 13th-century donation charters, including Desa's alleged 1151 charter that dates to the 13th century.

== Sources ==
- Кунчер, Драгана (2009). Gesta Regum Sclavorum. Vol. 1. Београд-Никшић: Историјски институт, Манастир Острог.
- Živković, Tibor (2009). Gesta Regum Sclavorum. Vol. 2. Београд-Никшић: Историјски институт, Манастир Острог.
- Vego, Marko (1980). Iz historije srednjovjekovne Bosne i Hercegovine (in Serbo-Croatian). Svjetlost.
- Svjetlost (1968). Život. Vol. 1. Svjetlost.
- Ćorović, Vladimir (1925). "Херцеговачки манастири" [Monasteries of Herzegovina]. Старинар (in Serbian). III (II). Belgrade: Srpsko arkheološko društvo, Arkheološki institut.
- Vizantološki institut (1963). Zbornik radova Vizantološkog instituta book 8 part 1. SANU.
