= Tribute of Ston =

The tribute of Ston (Serbo-Croatian: stonski tribut/стонски трибут), also called the income of Ston (stonski dohodak/стонски доходак), was a tribute paid by the Republic of Ragusa to the rulers of Serbia and Bosnia, and later to various Serbian monasteries.

In 1333, King Stefan IV Uroš Dušan Nemanjić of Serbia and Ban Stephen II of Bosnia, who had waged war for the control of Zachlumia, each decided to cede Ston and the peninsula of Pelješac to Ragusa in return for an annual payment of 500 perpera to both rulers.

In 1350 Stefan IV Dušan, now Emperor of Serbs and Greeks, ceded the Ston income to the Serbian Orthodox Monastery of the Holy Archangels Michael and Gabriel, run by Serbs in Jerusalem.

It continued to be paid to the Bans and Kings of Bosnia until the Ottoman conquest of the kingdom in 1463; Queen Catherine claimed it in exile but was refused by the government of Ragusa. The Jerusalemite monastery was closed soon afterwards, and the Serbian princess Mara Branković eventually succeeded in transferring the income to the Athonite monasteries of Serbian Orthodox Hilandar and Greek Orthodox Saint Paul's with the support of her stepson Mehmed the Conqueror. Mara's niece and heir Maria of Serbia, Queen of Bosnia, disputed the entitlement of the monasteries and claimed the income for herself until her death in c. 1500. After that, and the Bosnian-born Hersekzade Ahmed Pasha's intervention, it was regularly paid to the monasteries until the Republic was annexed by the First French Empire in 1808.
