= Luka, Dubrovnik-Neretva County =

Luka
- Settlement
- Location within Croatia
- Country: Croatia
- County: Dubrovnik-Neretva County
- Municipality: Ston

Area
  - Total: 0.27 sq mi (0.7 km^{2})

Population (2021)
  - Total: 151
  - Density: 560/sq mi (220/km^{2})
- Time zone: UTC+1 (CET)
  - Summer (DST): UTC+2 (CEST)
- Postal code: 20230 Ston

Luka is a village in the municipality of Ston, Croatia.

== Demographics ==
According to the 2021 census, its population was 151. It was 153 in 2011.
