= Katić =

Katić (pronounced [kǎːtitɕ], Serbian Cyrillic: Катић) is a Serbo-Croatian surname. It is sometimes transcribed as Katich. It's formed from the given name Kata and the matronymic -ić.

Notable people with the name include:

- Branka Katić (born 1970), Serbian actress
- Ilija Katić (born 1945), Serbian football player
- Janko Katić (fl. 1804–1806), Serbian revolutionary
- Mark Katic (born 1989), Canadian ice hockey player
- Mike Katic (born 2000), American football player and sports media personality
- Milan Katić (born 1993), Serbian volleyball player
- Miro Katić (born 1974), Bosnian football player
- Nikola Katić (born 1996), Croatian football player
- Raško Katić (born 1980), Serbian basketball player
- Stana Katic (born 1978), Canadian actress
- Toni Katić, Croatian basketball player
- Simon Katich, Australian cricketer

== See also ==
- Katič (disambiguation)
- Catich
