= Ivoševci =

Ivoševci Ивошевци (Serbian)
- Village
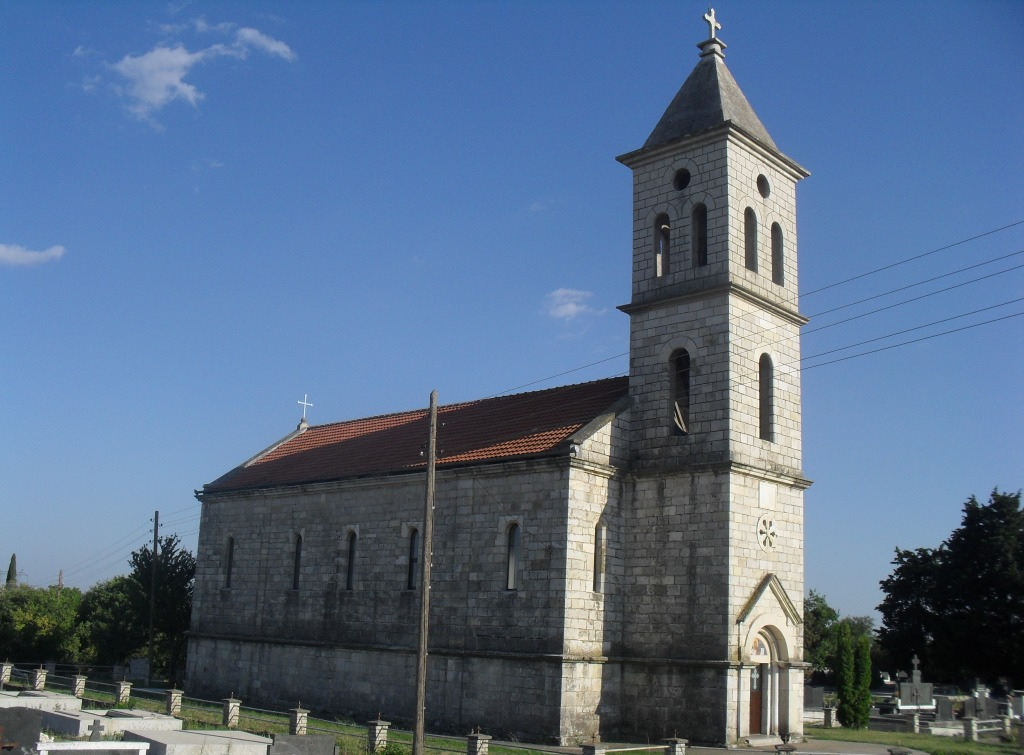
- Serb Orthodox church

- Location of Ivoševci in Croatia
- Coordinates: 44°01′N 15°58′E
- Country: Croatia
- County: Šibenik-Knin County
- Municipality: Kistanje

Area
  - Total: 46.3 km^{2} (17.9 sq mi)
- Elevation: 248 m (814 ft)

Population (2021)
  - Total: 251
  - Density: 5.42/km^{2} (14.0/sq mi)
- Time zone: UTC+1 (CET)
  - Summer (DST): UTC+2 (CEST)
- Postal code: 22305 Kistanje

Ivoševci (Serbian Cyrillic: Ивошевци) is a village located in the municipality of Kistanje, in the Šibenik-Knin County, Croatia. The village is situated in the region known as Bukovica. The population is 359 (census 2001).
