= Ljubić, Vitez =

Ljubić
- Village
- Location within Bosnia and Herzegovina
- Coordinates: 44.1826197°N 17.8005588°E
- Country: Bosnia and Herzegovina
- Entity: Federation of Bosnia and Herzegovina
- Canton: Central Bosnia
- Municipality: Vitez

Area
  - Total: 1.26 sq mi (3.27 km^{2})

Population (2013)
  - Total: 126
  - Density: 99.8/sq mi (38.5/km^{2})
- Time zone: UTC+1 (CET)
  - Summer (DST): UTC+2 (CEST)

Ljubić is a village in the municipality of Vitez, Bosnia and Herzegovina.

== Demographics ==
According to the 2013 census, its population was 126.

Ethnicity in 2013
Ethnicity	Number	Percentage
Bosniaks	99	78.6%
Croats	27	21.4%
Total	126	100%
