= Ljubić (surname) =

Ljubić is a Slavic surname.

== People with the name ==
- Božo Ljubić (born 1949), Croat politician of Bosnia and Herzegovina
- Ivan Ljubic (born 1996), Austrian footballer
- Juraj Ljubić (born 2000), Croatian footballer
- Marin Ljubić (born 1997), Croatian footballer
- Milan Ljubić (born 1978), Serbian politician
- Rajko Ljubič, Bačkan ethnic Croat film director from Serbia
- Šime Ljubić (1822–1896), Austrian Croat theologian, archeologist, and historian
- Stjepan Ljubić (1906–1986), Yugoslav Olympic cyclist
- Tatjana Majcen Ljubič, Slovenian Paralympian athlete
- Vittorio Gliubich (born Viktor Ljubić, 1902–1984), Italian rower

== See also ==
- Ljubić (disambiguation)
