= Pelješac Bridge =

Cable-stayed bridge in Dubrovnik-Neretva County, Croatia

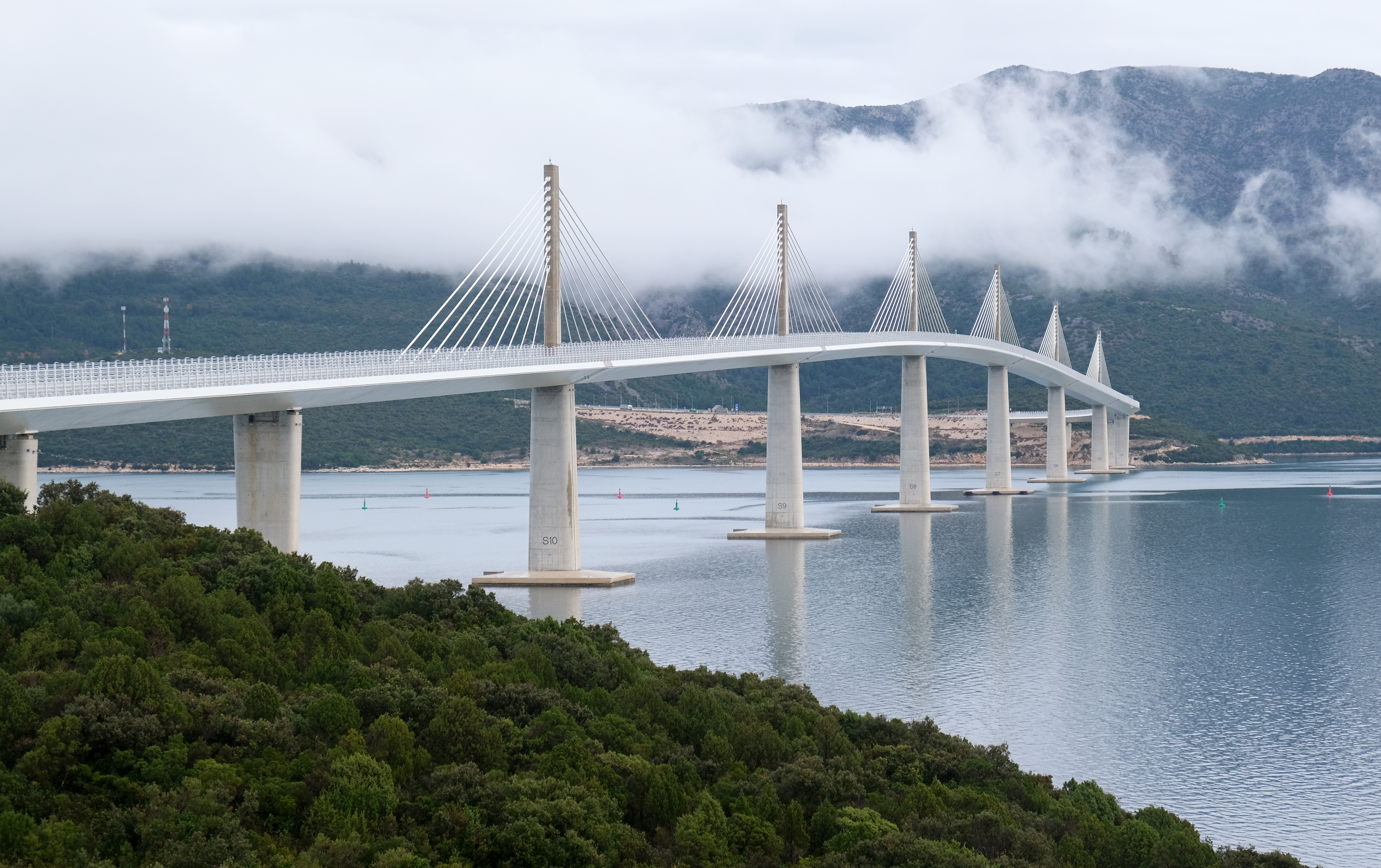
- Coordinates: 42°55′58″N 17°32′13″E
- Carries: 2-lane wide D8 expressway
- Crosses: Neretva Channel / Bay of Mali Ston
- Locale: Dubrovnik-Neretva County, Croatia
- Official name: Pelješki most
- Maintained by: Hrvatske ceste

Characteristics
- Design: Cable-stayed bridge
- Total length: 2,404 metres (7,887 ft)
- Width: 23.6 metres (77 ft)
- Height: 98 metres (322 ft)
- Longest span: 5 x 285 metres (935 ft)
- Clearance below: 55 metres (180 ft)
- Design life: 100 years

History
- Designer: Marjan Pipenbaher
- Constructed by: China Road and Bridge Corporation
- Construction start: 30 July 2018
- Construction end: 26 July 2022
- Construction cost: €420.3 million
- Opened: 26 July 2022; 4 years ago

Statistics
- Daily traffic: 7,000 (full year); 15,000 (summer)
- Toll: None

Location
- Interactive map of Pelješac Bridge

The Pelješac Bridge (Croatian: Pelješki most, pronounced [pěʎeʃkiː môːst]) is a cable-stayed bridge in Dubrovnik-Neretva County, Croatia. The bridge provides a fixed link from the southeastern Croatian semi-exclave to the rest of the country while bypassing Bosnia and Herzegovina's short coastal strip at Neum. The bridge spans the sea channel between Komarna on the northern mainland and the peninsula of Pelješac, thereby passing entirely through Croatian territory and avoiding any border crossings with Bosnia and Herzegovina at Neum.

Construction started on 30 July 2018, and the bridge was connected on 28 July 2021. The bridge and its access roads opened for traffic on 26 July 2022. Ston bypass road was opened on 19 April 2023, allowing buses, heavy trucks, and trucks carrying hazardous loads to access the bridge.

== Characteristics ==
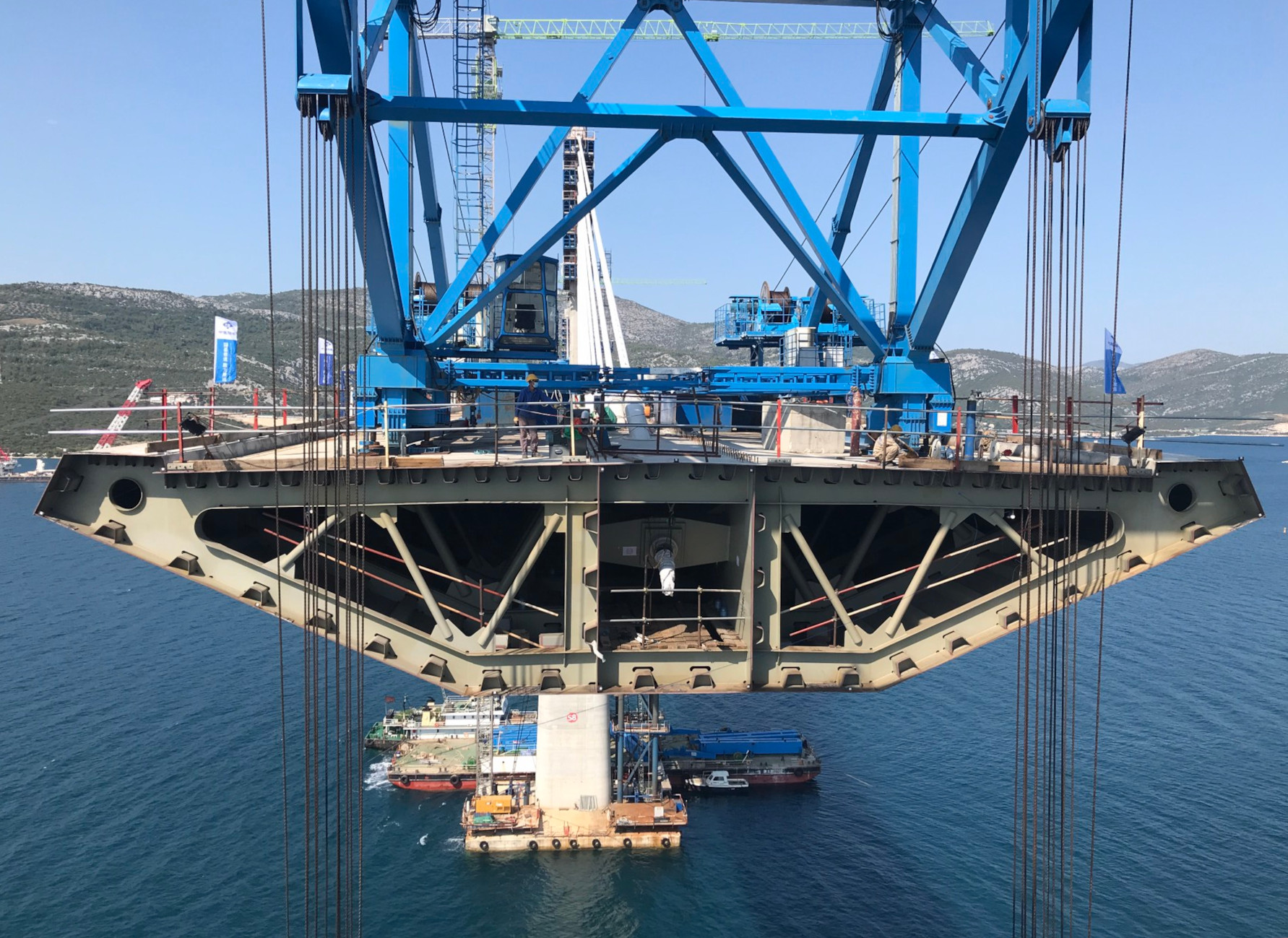
Installation of the last span segment in July 2021

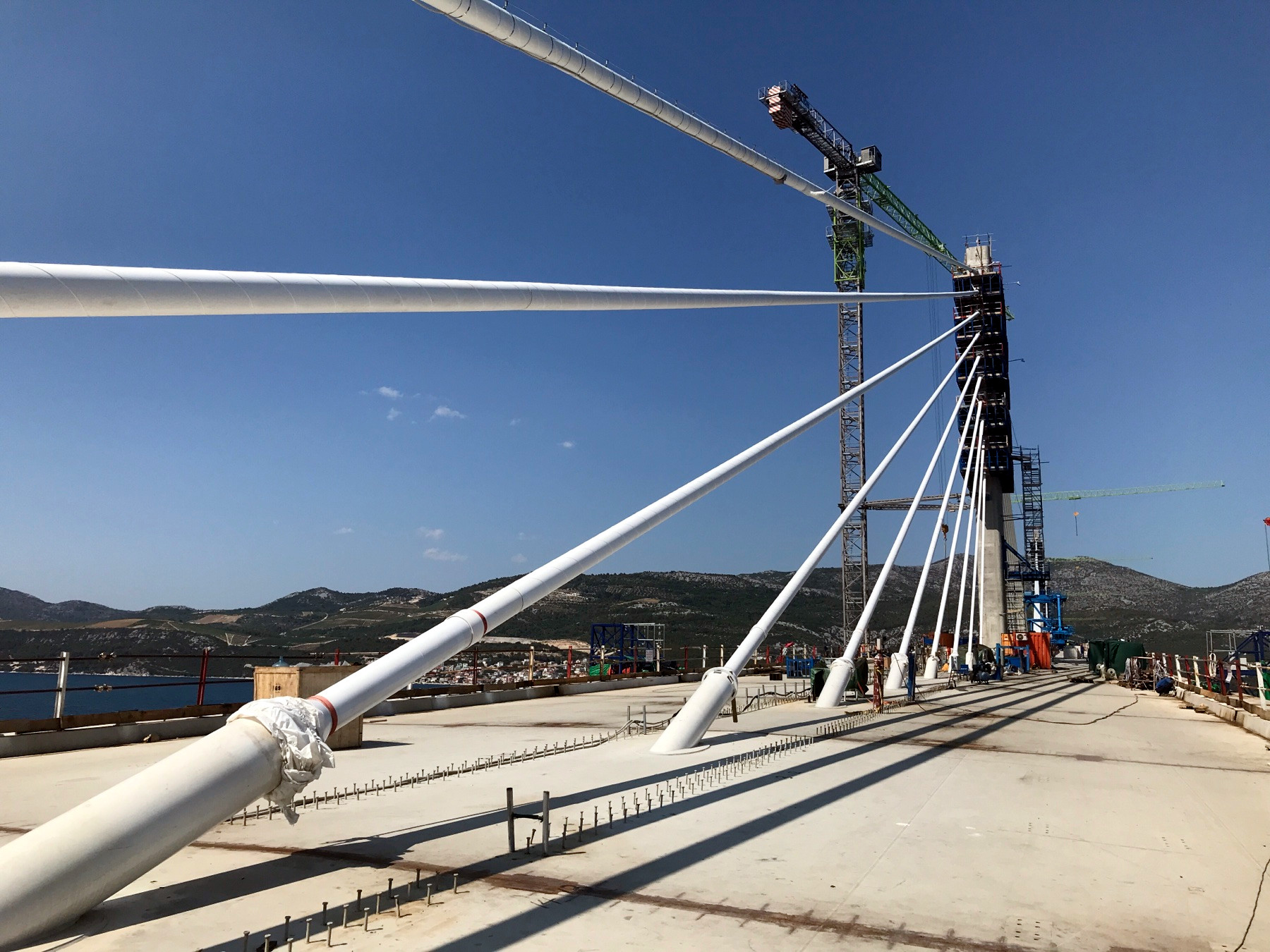
Deck and cables in July 2021

The original 2007 design for the bridge had a main span of 568 metres (1,864 ft). This design was modified, and the bridge was built as a multi-span cable-stayed bridge with a total length of 2,404 metres (7,887 ft). It comprises thirteen spans, of which seven are cable-stayed; five central 285-metre (935 ft) spans and two outer 203.5-metre (668 ft) spans. Two pylons around the 200-by-55-metre (656 ft × 180 ft) navigation channel are 98 metres (322 ft) above sea level and 222 metres (728 ft) above the seabed. The bridge was designed by Slovenian engineer Marjan Pipenbaher.

Both sides of the bridge are served by access roads, including two tunnels on Pelješac (one 2,467 metres (8,090 ft) and the other 499 metres (1,640 ft) long), as well as two smaller bridges on Pelješac (one 420 metres (1,400 ft) and another 131 metres (430 ft) long).

== History ==
Location of the bridge

Because the Croatian mainland is intersected by a small strip of the coast around the town of Neum which is part of Bosnia and Herzegovina, forming Bosnia and Herzegovina's only outlet to the Adriatic Sea, the physical connection of the southernmost part of Dalmatia with the rest of Croatia is limited to Croatian territorial waters. In 1996, Bosnia and Herzegovina and Croatia signed the Neum Agreement, granting Croatia passage through Neum, but the agreement was never ratified. All traffic passing through the Neum corridor has to undergo border checks on goods and persons. Therefore, people travelling from the Dubrovnik exclave to mainland Croatia had to pass through two border checks within 9 kilometres (5.6 mi). With Croatia joining the Schengen Area in 2023 (which it was bound to do in accordance with the conditions of its accession to the European Union), checks would become considerably more stringent and time-consuming, as the Schengen Borders Code requires checks not only when entering the Schengen area, but also when exiting it. Thus, someone travelling from Dubrovnik to mainland Croatia through Neum would undergo three distinct border checks: a Croatian (Schengen) exit check, a Bosnian-Herzegovinian entry check and a Croatian (Schengen) entry check.

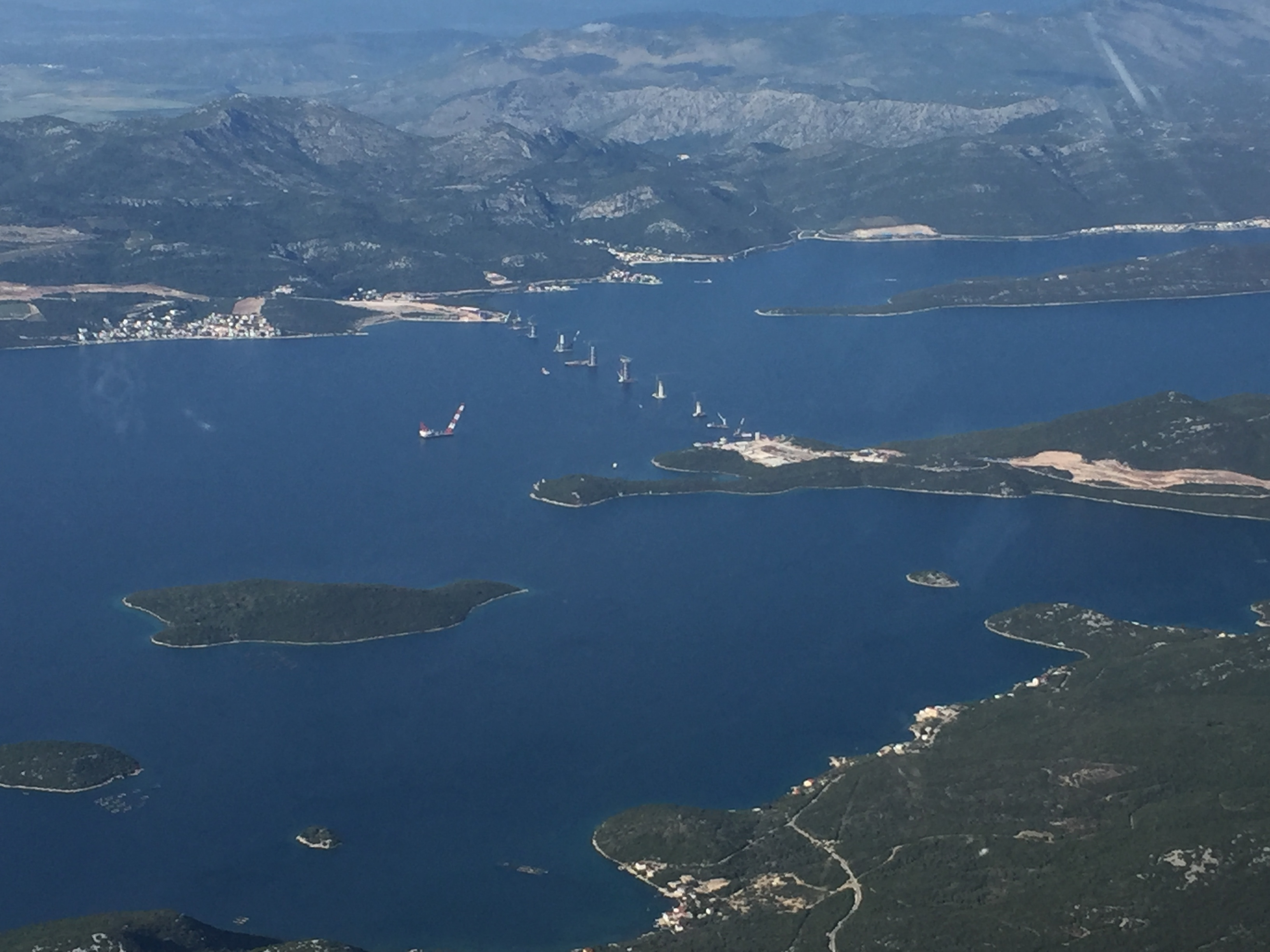
Construction site in June 2020

The construction of the bridge was publicly proposed in 1997 by Ivan Šprlje, the Prefect of the Dubrovnik-Neretva County and member of the Social Democratic Party (SDP). Croatian Democratic Union (HDZ) initially rejected the idea, but in 1998 it gained support of their MP Luka Bebić. In 2000, the bridge was added to the spatial plan of the county and the first construction plans were drawn up.

The construction works on the Pelješac project officially commenced in November 2005 with a grand opening led by then-Prime Minister Ivo Sanader. Despite the price of the bridge project rising significantly compared to the initial estimate, the Government persisted with the idea of a bridge. The initial design was changed to reflect the concerns of Bosnia and Herzegovina to the first plans. The two sides agreed on the construction of the bridge in early December 2006.

In May 2007, the Croatian Minister of Infrastructure Božidar Kalmeta said that preparations for the construction of the bridge were going according to plan and that an initial tender was under preparation. Kalmeta added that the question of when the construction works would begin depended on whether a constructor would be selected in the first round. On 11 June 2007, Hrvatske ceste announced a public tender for the construction of the bridge. On 28 August 2007, the list of bidders was released: Konstruktor, Viadukt and Hidroelektra (from Croatia); Dywidag (Germany), Strabag (Austria), Cimolai (Italy), Eiffel (France); and Alpine Bau (from Salzburg, Austria)

Kalmeta confirmed construction works were to start in autumn 2007. The contractor was to be obliged to complete the project in four years. Construction costs were estimated at 1.9 billion HRK, nearly €260 million. It would be financed by Hrvatske ceste and by loans by European investment banks.

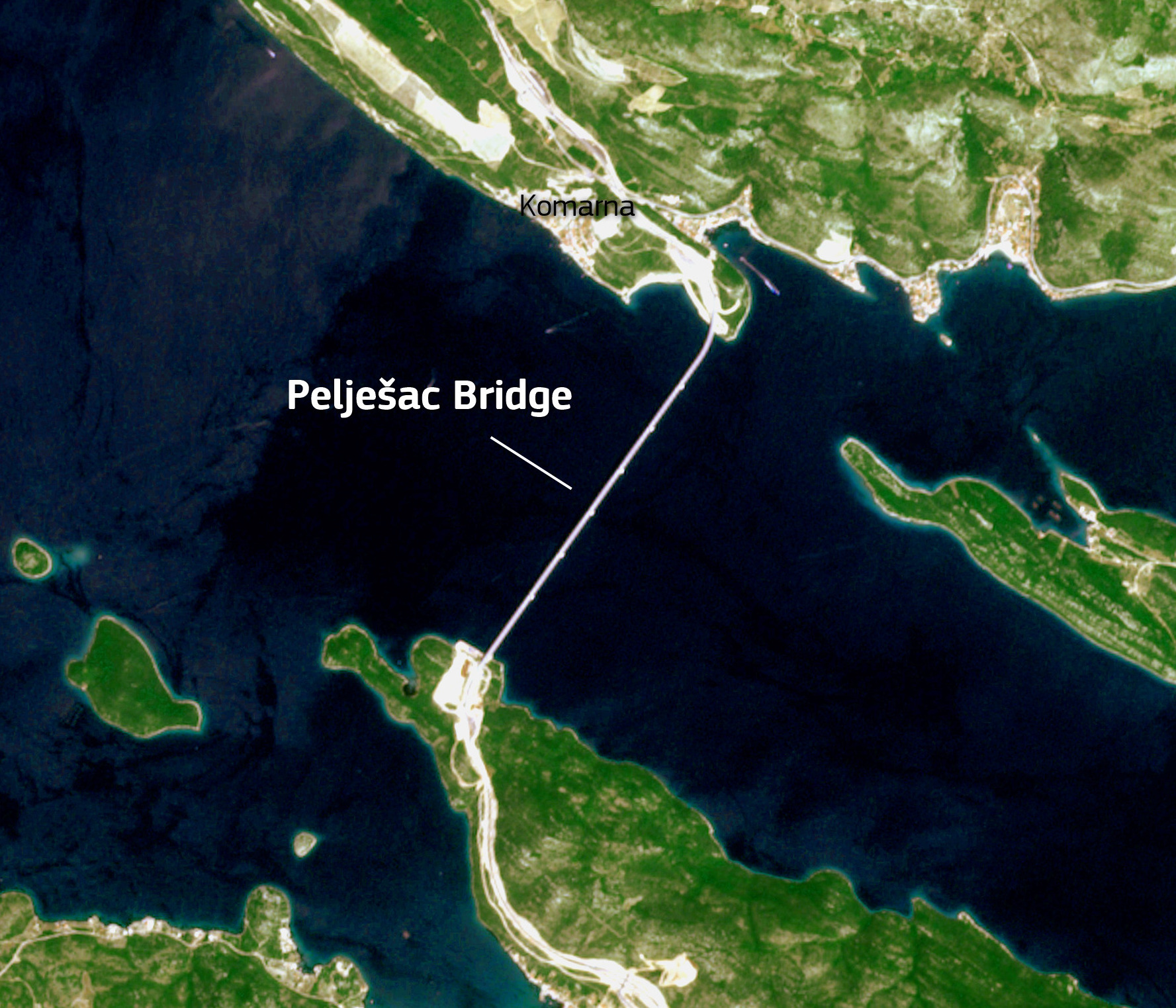
A Sentinel-2 image of the bridge.

In June 2007, after the tender was published, the media reported renewed opposition from the State Border Commission in Bosnia and Herzegovina. Bosnia and Herzegovina declared that it would sue Croatia if it started building the bridge unilaterally.

On 14 September 2007, the Ministry of Construction announced that the Konstruktor/Viadukt/Hidroelektra consortium had won the contest and that it would sign a contract for 1.94 billion HRK, roughly €265 million at the time. Construction works on the northern and southern termini commenced on 24 October 2007, with sea works starting in the autumn of 2008.

In July 2009, the Croatian Government under Jadranka Kosor announced that, as part of the effort to reduce expenses during the economic crisis, the construction of the Pelješac Bridge was to proceed under a much slower timetable than originally planned. In November 2009, Kalmeta mentioned 2015 as the year of completion. The 2010 budget and road-building programme indicated that by the end of 2012, only 433.5 million HRK or €60 million would be invested in the bridge, which is less than a quarter of the total.

After the 2011 Croatian parliamentary election, the new SDP-led government terminated the existing construction contract worth 1.94 billion HRK (c. €259 million) for lack of funds in May 2012. At the same time, plans were made to use the bridge construction sites as new ferry docking sites. There was also discussion regarding how the cost and speed of the ferry solution would compare to that of the cancelled bridge, with the Minister of Maritime Affairs, Transport and Infrastructure claiming the ferrying would be less expensive and reasonably fast, as well as complete by 1 July 2013, which is when Croatia joined the European Union and when the new border regime could have become a problem.

In 2012, the European Union granted Croatia a sum of €200,000 for a pre-feasibility study of the construction of the Pelješac Bridge. The study would examine not only the projected bridge, but also the solution of a closed road corridor across the hinterland of Neum. "The strategic aim of the Government is to effectively connect the territory of Croatia, which is also a goal of the EU, because the Croatian territory is to become a territory of the Union. This project should not be politicized, but rather we should see which action is most cost-effective", Minister of Foreign Affairs Vesna Pusić claimed. She also emphasized that the ratification of the Tuđman-Izetbegović treaty of 1996 (Neum Agreement) was not a condition to receive European funds for the construction of the bridge, but it would be no harm if it did happen.

The feasibility study prepared by Croatia to analyse the possible alternatives concluded that building a bridge would be the most favourable option as it scored highest in the multi-criteria (safety, impact on traffic, environmental impact) and cost-benefit analysis, compared to the other options; a highway corridor, a ferry connection or the construction of tunnels. The project was prepared in consultation with the authorities of Bosnia and Herzegovina. The necessity to preserve Croatia's natural heritage was an essential criteria taken into consideration at all phases of the project's preparation.

The European Commission also had the project assessed before adoption independent experts in the framework of the Joint Assistance to Support Projects in European Regions (JASPERS) as regards its feasibility and economic viability.

A French study suggested in December 2013 that the bridge was the most feasible solution, and Croatian Minister of Transport Siniša Hajdaš Dončić stated that the construction of the bridge would start in 2015. In July 2015, Croatia's government said that construction was likely to start in spring 2016.

By 2016, the Croatian government was saying construction would go ahead with or without EU funds. Construction dates were further delayed by a formal complaint about tender documents.

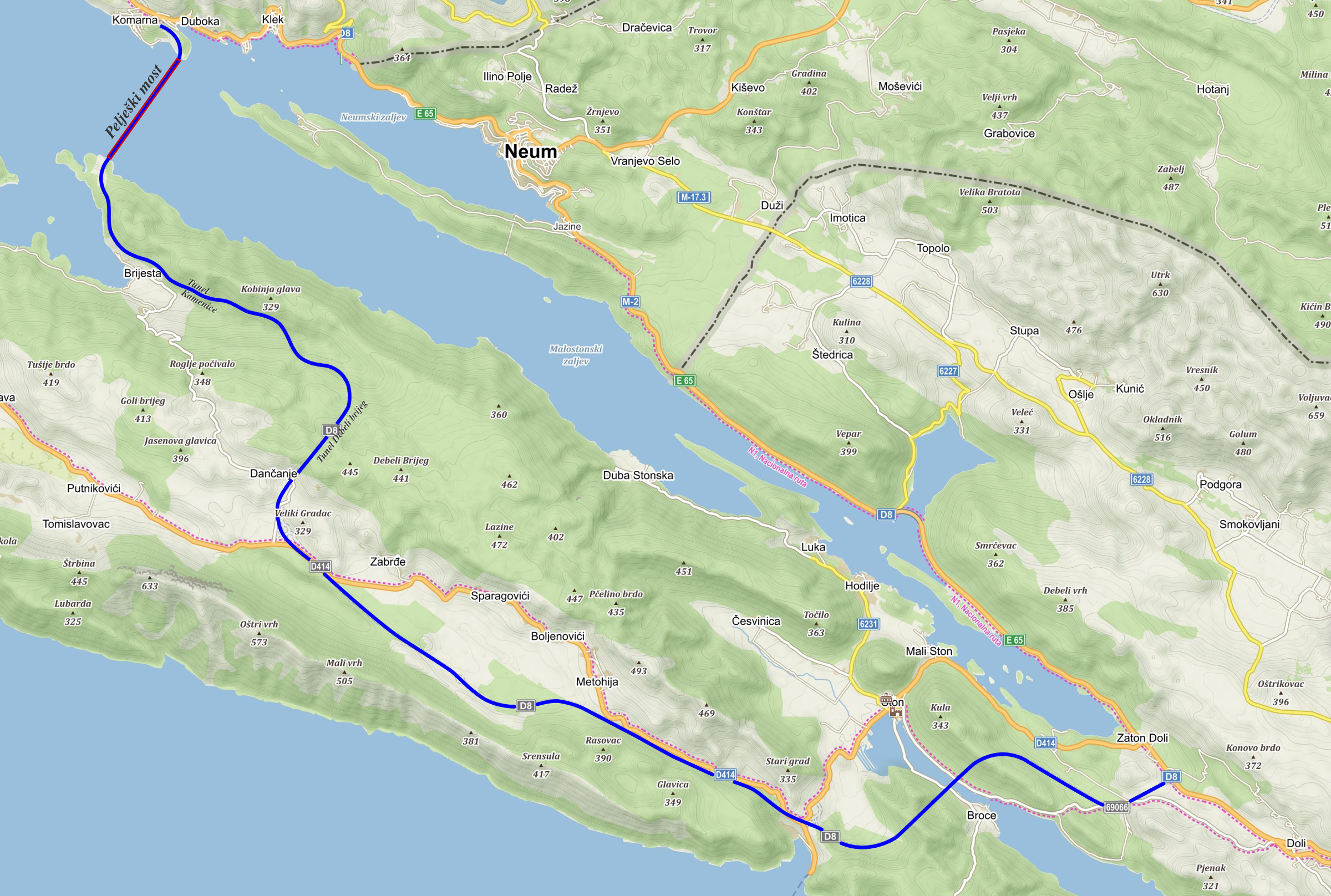
Map of the bridge and access roads

The European Commission announced on 7 June 2017 that €357 million from Cohesion Policy funds will be made available for the bridge and the supporting infrastructure (tunnels, bypasses, viaducts and access roads), with completion scheduled for 2022. The EU contribution would amount to 85% of the total construction costs, aiming at benefiting tourism, trade, and territorial cohesion.

Despite protests from Bosnian political actors, Croatian Minister of Regional Development Gabrijela Žalac as well as Croatian Prime Minister Andrej Plenković confirmed that the construction of the bridge would continue.

On 15 September 2017, it was announced that China Road and Bridge Corporation, Austrian Strabag and Italian-Turkish consortium Astaldi/Içtas applied for a bridge construction tender. The Austrians offered the cost of 2.6 billion HRK (€351 million), the Italian-Turkish offer was 2.6 billion HRK (€341 million), while the Chinese offer was 2.1 billion HRK (€278 million). On 15 January 2018, Hrvatske ceste made a formal decision according to which China Road and Bridge Corporation won the tender. In addition to the lowest price, CRBC also offered to complete the project six months faster than required. Construction had started by mid 2019, with the construction of the bridge pillars in October.

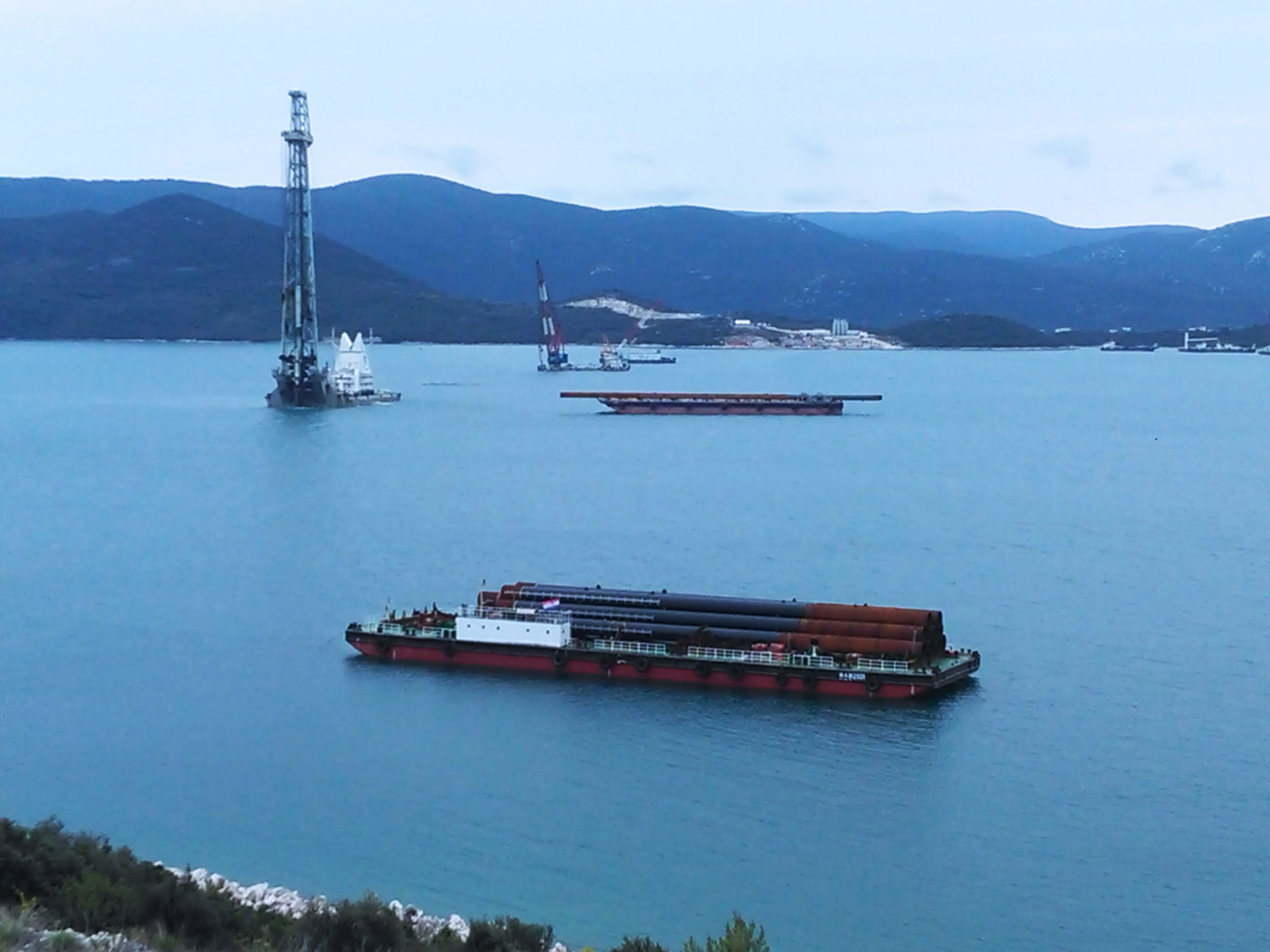
April 2019

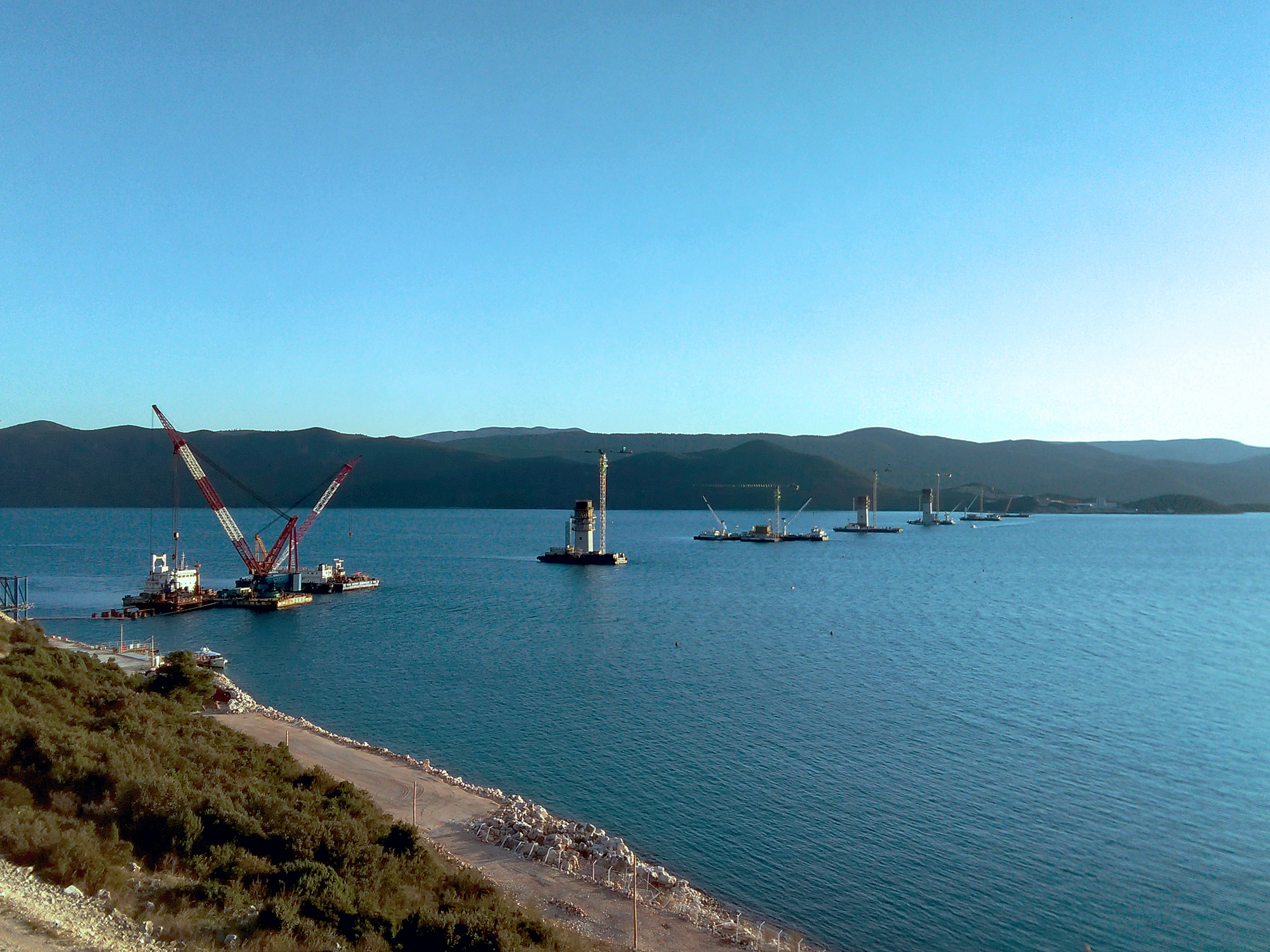
February 2020

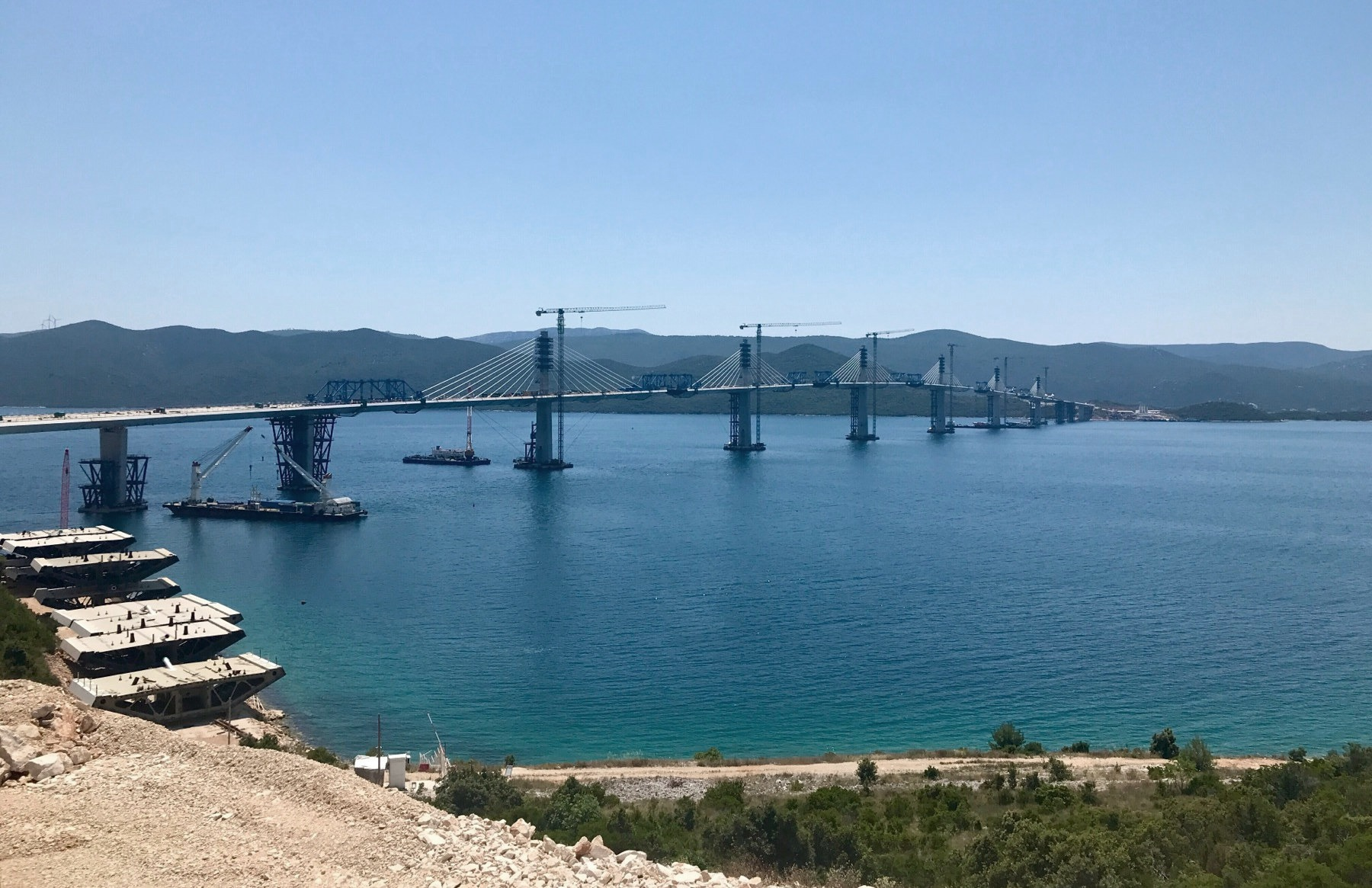
June 2021

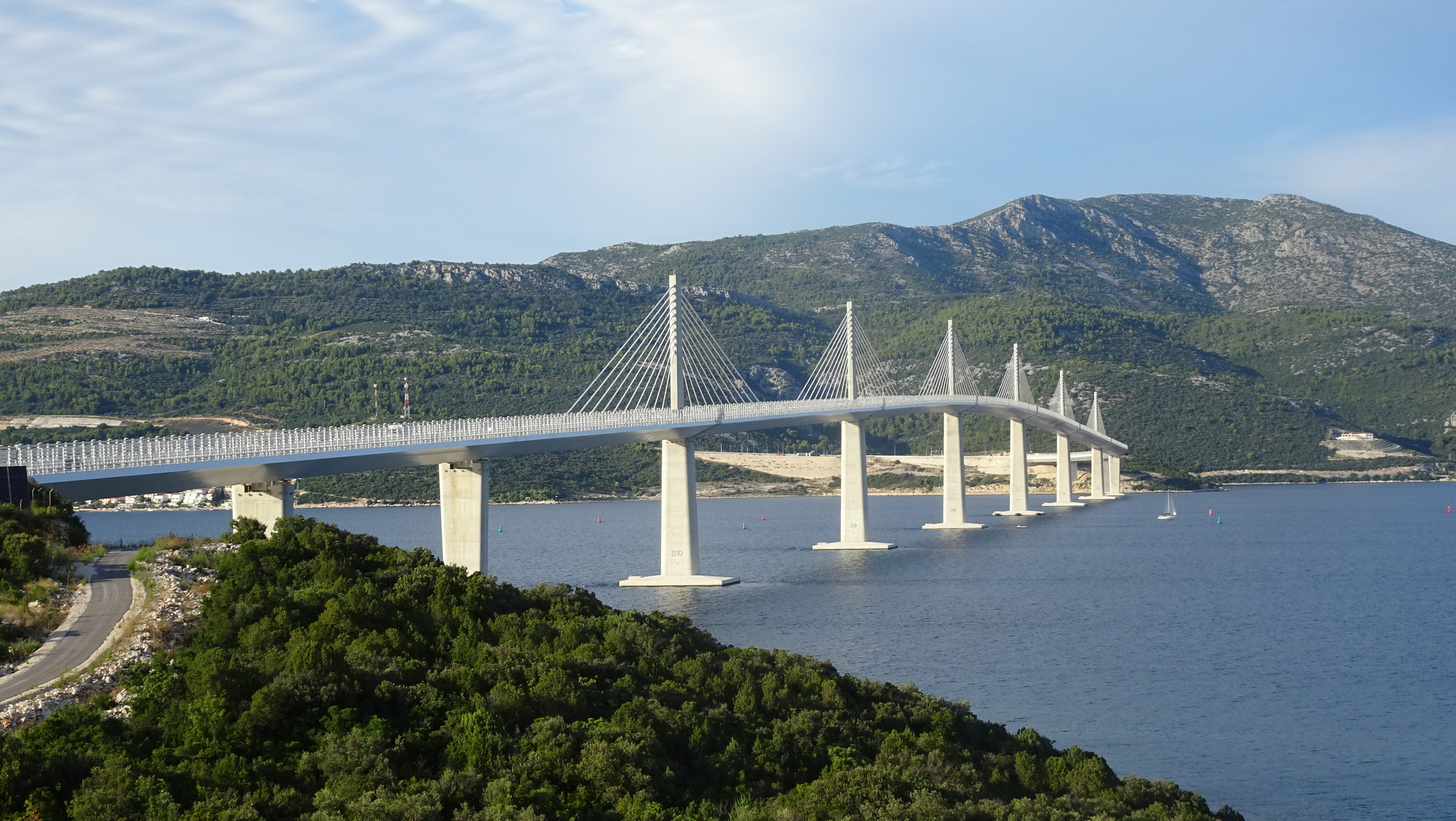
August 2023

The bridge and its access roads opened for traffic on 26 July 2022. Ston bypass road was opened on 19 April 2023, allowing buses, heavy trucks, and trucks carrying hazardous loads to access the bridge.

== Controversial aspects ==
=== Environmental protection ===
The idea of a large bridge connecting Pelješac to the mainland caused concern among environmental activists in Croatia, who opposed it because of potential damage to sea life in the Bay of Mali Ston, as well as to mariculture. These risks and concerns were explicitly addressed by the constructors in preliminary studies.

In October 2015, the Croatian Ministry of Environment and Nature Protection issued a decision, confirming that a cross-border consultation was carried out concerning the impact of the project on the environment of Bosnia and Herzegovina according to the Convention on Environmental Impact Assessment in a Transboundary Context. Bosnia and Herzegovina did not submit its observations or request an extension of the consultation's timeframe.

=== Cost-benefit analysis ===
The idea was also opposed for various economic reasons: questions of whether such a bridge was really necessary or whether alternative arrangements could be made with Bosnia and Herzegovina, whether it would be too expensive to build according to environmental standards, and whether it would be better to build an undersea tunnel instead.

The idea of instead constructing an immersed tube as a more cost-effective design which did not impede access to Neum was ridiculed and never accepted by the Croatian authorities.

According to the news program Dnevnik Nove TV, another possibility was a highway corridor through Bosnia and Herzegovina with high walls and strict surveillance.

In the process of accession of Croatia to the European Union, the Croatian Government claimed that a bridge would be a "prerequisite" for Croatia to enter the Schengen Area. The European Commission nevertheless stated in 2010 that this was only one of several options to handle the issue.

=== International law and access of Bosnia and Herzegovina to international waters ===
The construction of the bridge was also opposed by various political figures in Bosnia and Herzegovina, mostly Bosniak, who said that it would restrict Bosnia and Herzegovina's access to international waters. Several Bosnian politicians initially opposed the building of the bridge, originally planned to be only 35 metres (115 ft) high, because that would have made it impossible for large ships to enter the harbor at Neum. Although the Neum harbor is not currently suitable for commercial traffic, and most of the trade to and from Bosnia and Herzegovina goes through the Croatian port of Ploče, several Bosnian politicians remarked that a new port might be built in the future, and that the construction of the bridge would frustrate this ambition.

In August 2017, a group of unnamed Bosnian MPs wrote a letter to the High Representative of the EU for Foreign Affairs and Security Policy Federica Mogherini of Italy, and to the High Representative for Bosnia and Herzegovina Valentin Inzko of Austria, claiming that Croatia was in violation of the United Nations Convention on the Law of the Sea and was "cutting off without permission" their country from international waters through the Pelješac Bridge project, calling upon Croatia "to stop attacking the sovereignty of Bosnia and Herzegovina as a maritime state and stop all activities on building an illegal and politically violent bridge project at the Komarna-Pelješac location". The Bosnian MPs noted that Bosnia and Herzegovina had never given formal consent, by the Council of Ministers nor by the Presidency, to the bridge project and its financing with EU funds.

Croatia stated that the bridge is located exclusively within Croatian territory and Croatian territorial waters and that it is thus entitled under the international law of the sea to construct the bridge without requiring any consent from Bosnia and Herzegovina. Croatia also expressed commitment to fully respect the international rights enjoyed by other countries in the Pelješac peninsula, including the right of innocent passage enjoyed by all countries under the United Nations Convention on the Law of the Sea, and the right of Bosnia and Herzegovina to have unrestricted access to the high seas. Croatia also stated that the expected height of the bridge of 55 metres (180 ft) would allow all current Bosnian shipping to use the existing navigational route to transit under the bridge, and that any ship taller than that which intended to dock at a port in Bosnia and Herzegovina could dock instead at the Croatian port of Ploče, in line with the 1995 Free Transit agreement.

=== Link with border demarcation treaty ratification ===
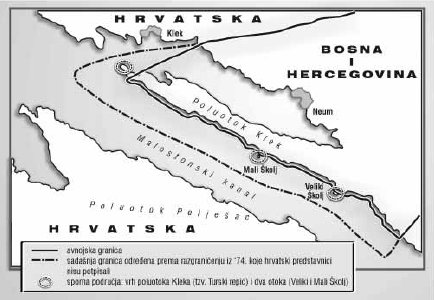
Borders of Bosnia Herzegovina (solid line) near Neum as modified (dashed line) according to the 1999 agreement

Bosnia and Herzegovina and Croatia agreed on a border demarcation treaty in 1998. The treaty was signed by the two former presidents, Alija Izetbegović and Franjo Tuđman, but it was never ratified by the respective parliaments and so it never entered into force. The agreement included a border between the two countries in the area of Pelješac which is slightly different from that shown on maps, since Croatia agreed to recognise the sovereignty of Bosnia and Herzegovina over two small rock islands (Mali Školj and Veliki Školj) and the tip of the peninsula of Klek near Neum.

On 17 October 2007, the Presidency of Bosnia and Herzegovina adopted an official position stating that "Bosnia and Herzegovina opposes the construction of the [Pelješac] Bridge until the issues related to the determination of the sea borderline between the two countries are resolved" and asking Croatia not to undertake any unilateral actions concerning the construction of the bridge. Bosnian MP Halid Genjac stated that this official position has never been reversed and is thus still in force, and no official Bosnian body has given its express consent to the construction of the bridge. He argued that "the claims that Croatia is building a bridge on its territory are incorrect because the sea waters beneath the Pelješac Bridge are not and cannot be Croatian or internal waters, but international waters stretching from the territorial waters of Bosnia and Herzegovina to the open sea".

The Bosniak member of the Presidency, Bakir Izetbegović, stated that he believed Croatia should not proceed with the building of the bridge before the maritime border demarcation was agreed, based on the 2007 position of the Presidency, and that the agreement for the use of the port of Ploče had not been ratified.

The Croat member of the Presidency, Dragan Čović continuously supported the construction of the Bridge and stated that "problematizing the construction of Pelješac Bridge is not the official position of Bosnia and Herzegovina. The official position of recent years has been in the sense of encouraging Croatia to continue with such an infrastructure project that is of great importance for Bosnia and Herzegovina as well. In this case, it's about one party's (Party of Democratic Action) position and of a couple of individuals in that party. Croatia complied with all the set conditions."

The Serb member of the Presidency Mladen Ivanić stated that he supported construction and that it was necessary to ensure that maritime arrangements allowed ships to freely travel to Neum.

President of Republika Srpska Milorad Dodik stated in August 2017 that Croatia had the right to build the Pelješac Bridge, adding that Bosniak parties were unnecessarily creating problems.

== Traffic ==
Traffic flow on the bridge shows significant seasonal fluctuations, with summer months reaching highest numbers of crossings.

During August 2022, around 455,000 vehicles crossed the bridge. Two million crossings were reached at 30 June 2023, and three million at 12 September 2023.

== Awards ==
- Gustav Lindenthal Medal by Western Pennsylvania Engineers Association (June 2023)
- FIDIC project award (September 2023)
