= Vlaka =

Vlaka may refer to:

- Vlaka, Ravno, a village in Bosnia and Herzegovina in Ravno municipality. Formerly it was in Trebinje municipality
- Vlaka, Vrgorac, a village in the municipality Vrgorac, Split-Dalmatia County, Croatia
- Vlaka, Dubrovnik-Neretva County, a village in municipality Slivno, Dubrovnik-Neretva County, Croatia
- Vlaka (island), an island in the Adriatic Sea, one of the Paklinski Islands

== Other ==
- Vlaka, a Greek word for stupid/idiot male. Often used by Greeks when speaking English. Female version is vlammeni
