= Trn =

Trn may refer to:

== Geography ==
- Trn, Široki Brijeg, a village in Široki Brijeg municipality, Bosnia and Herzegovina
- Trn, Velika Kladuša, a village in Velika Kladuša municipality, Bosnia and Herzegovina
- Tran, Bulgaria, a town in Pernik Province
- Trn, Croatia, a village in the municipality of Slivno, Dubrovnik-Neretva County
- Trn, North Macedonia, a village in Bitola municipality
- Trn (Kuršumlija), a village in Kuršumlija municipality, Serbia

== Other ==
- The trn newsreader, a threading variant of rn

== See also ==
- TRN (disambiguation)
