= List of lighthouses in Bosnia and Herzegovina =

This is a list of lighthouses in Bosnia and Herzegovina.

== Lighthouses ==
Name	Image	Year built	Location & coordinates	Class of Light	Focal height	NGA number	Admiralty number	Range nml
Lopata Lighthouse		n/a	Neum 42°56′05.0″N 17°33′53.3″E	Fl R 3s.	6 metres (20 ft)	13796	E3521.3	4
Luka Neum Lighthouse		n/a	Neum; 42°55′07.7″N 17°37′01.6″E	Fl R 3s.	6 metres (20 ft)	13800	E3521.5	4
Rep Kleka Lighthouse		n/a	Klek Peninsula; 42°56′03.4″N 17°33′09.2″E	Fl W 3s.	8 metres (26 ft)	13792	E3521	5

== See also ==
- Lists of lighthouses and lightvessels
- Veliki Školj
- Mali Školj
- Klek peninsula
