= Mirjana Isaković =

Serbian sculptor and ceramicist

Mirjana Isakovic

Mirjana Isaković is a Serbian sculptor and ceramist.

== Personal life ==
She was born in Serbia in 1936. She is married to Halil Tikvesa, a Bosnian painter and graphic designer with whom she has a daughter Lana Tikvesa.

== Education ==
Isaković graduated from the Academy of Applied Arts of University of Arts in Belgrade in 1963, the same year she became a member of "The Applied Artists and Designers Association of Serbia" (ULUPUDS).

== Career ==
In 1971, she was elected professor at the Academy of Applied Arts. She established the important "Belgrade School". She mentored fourteen MA students who matriculated from the Academy of Applied Arts.

In 1972 she became a professor at the Academy where she chaired the departmental studio for ceramics and ceramic sculpture. She retired in 2002.

== Exhibitions ==
=== Solo exhibitions ===
- 1964 Gallery "Savremeni dom", Belgrade
- 1966 Gallery "Nadežda Petrović" Čačak
- 1969 Gallery "Grafički kolektiv", Belgrade
- 1976 Gallery of Cultural Center, Belgrade
- 1978 "Homage to Ivan Tabaković" (with Rosić and Stajević), Arandjelovac
- 1985 "Galerija likovnih stvaralaca", Arandjelovac
- 1985 "Mali likovni salon", Novi Sad
- 1985 Gallery "Singidunum", Belgrade
- 1986 Cultural Center, Banjaluka
- 1989 Pavilion Cvijeta Zuzorić, as the laureate of Grand Prix of May Salon
- 1990 City Museum "Bassano del Grappa", Italy (five Central European ceramic artists, each with an individual show: Polgar, Spurej, Vikova, Sramel, Isaković)

PRIMAVERA

=== Group exhibitions ===
Over 150 in the country and abroad

=== Juried group exhibitions in Serbia (a selection) ===
- October Salon: 1967, 1968, 1969, 1970, 1974, 1975, 1976, 1977, 1979, 1980, 1986, 1995, 1997, 1999, 2001
- May Salon: 1969, 1970, 1975, 1976, 1977, 1979, 1980, 1986, 1993
- Biennale of Belgrade Ceramics: 1978, 1980
- Triennial of Yugoslav Ceramics: 1968, 1974, 1977, 1980, 1983, 1986, 1989, 1996, 1999, 2003
- 1965 Yugoslav Ceramics, Museum of Applied Art, Belgrade
- 1972 Contemporary Art of Ceramics and Glass, Galerija Kulturnog centra, Belgrade
- 1972 Contemporary Art of Ceramics and Glass, Museum of Arts and Crafts, Zagreb
- 1978 The First Sarajevo Triennial of Art, Sarajevo
- 1978 Contemporary Tapestry and ceramics of Yugoslavia, Belgrade
- 1981 NOB (The People's Liberation Movement) in the Works of Yugoslav Artists, Belgrade, Ljubljana, Sarajevo

=== Juried international exhibitions (with international juries) ===
- 1967 International Exhibition of Ceramics, Istanbul, Turkey
- 1970 International Exhibition of Ceramics, Cervi, Italy
- 1970 International Exhibition of Ceramics, Sopot, Poland
- 1975 Contemporary Ceramics and Glass, Moscow, USSR
- 1975 International Biennale of Ceramics, Valory, France
- 1977 International Biennale of Ceramics, Faenya, Italy
- 1978 Contemporary Tapestry, Ceramics and Glass, Czechoslovakia, Hungary, East Germany
- 1982 II International Biennale of Ceramics, Piran, Slovenia
- 1984 III International Biennale of Ceramics, Piran, Slovenia
- 1984 I International Triennial of Small Ceramics, Zagreb
- 1985 I Triennial of Small Ceramics, Belgrade, Sarajevo, Priština, Novi Sad ( selection)
- 1986 IV International Biennale of Ceramics, Piran, Slovenia
- 1986 International Competition - Triennial "Mino'86", Nagoya, Japan
- 1987 A Selection of Yugoslav Ceramics, Frankfurt, Germany
- 1989 "The Contemporary Moment in European Ceramics", (by invitation), Lyon - France, Linz - Austria, Budapest - Hungary, Helsinki - Finland
- 1990 III Biennale of Small Ceramics, Zagreb
- 1992 I International Biennale of Ceramics, Cairo, Egypt
- 1996 I International Triennale "The Cup'96", Kulturni centar, Belgrade
- 2000 Thematic International Biennale, Carouge, Switzerland
- 2001 International Biennale of Small Form, Gornji Milanovac

== Prizes and awards ==
- 1968 Likovni Susret Subotice prize at First Triennial of Yugoslav Ceramics
- 1970 Ceramics prize, May Salon, Belgrade
- 1970 "Diploma d'onore", International Exhibition of Ceramics, Cervi, Italy
- 1977 May Salon Prize, Belgrade
- 1977 Grand Prix, at Third Triennial of Yugoslav Ceramics
- 1977 Annual ULUPUDSPrize (for 1976/1977)
- 1981 Exhibition NOB (The People's Liberation Movement) Prize in the Works of Yugoslav Artists, Belgrade
- 1984 Honorary Diploma at First International Triennial of Small Ceramics, Zagreb
- 1986 Grand Prix of May Salon, Belgrade
- 1986 Grand Prix at Sixth Triennial of Yugoslav Ceramics, Subotica, Belgrade
- 1986 ULUPUDS Prize at October Salon
- 1986 Honorable mention at International Competition "Mino'86", Nagoya, Japan
- 1986 Grand Plaque of the University of Arts, Belgrade, for pedagogical work
- 1998 Award for Life's Work from ULUPUDS
- 1998 Plaque with Silver Medal from Professorial and Art Assembly of Faculty of Applied Arts "for extraordinary contribution to the development of this institution for high education"

== Works in public spaces (ceramic sculptures) ==
- Belgrade, Serbia
- Subotica, Serbia
- Arandjelovac, Serbia
- Užice, Serbia
- Zadar, Croatia
- Čačak, Croatia
