= TRN =

TRN may refer to:

- Taiga Rescue Network
- Talk Radio Network, US radio syndicator
- Terrain Relative Navigation, NASA technology used by Mars landers
- Thalamic reticular nucleus
- The Rail Network, an American television network
- Times Record News, a daily newspaper in Wichita Falls, Texas
- Turin International Airport, Italy, IATA code

== See also ==
- Trn (disambiguation)
