= Mihalj, Dubrovnik-Neretva County =

Mihalj
- Village
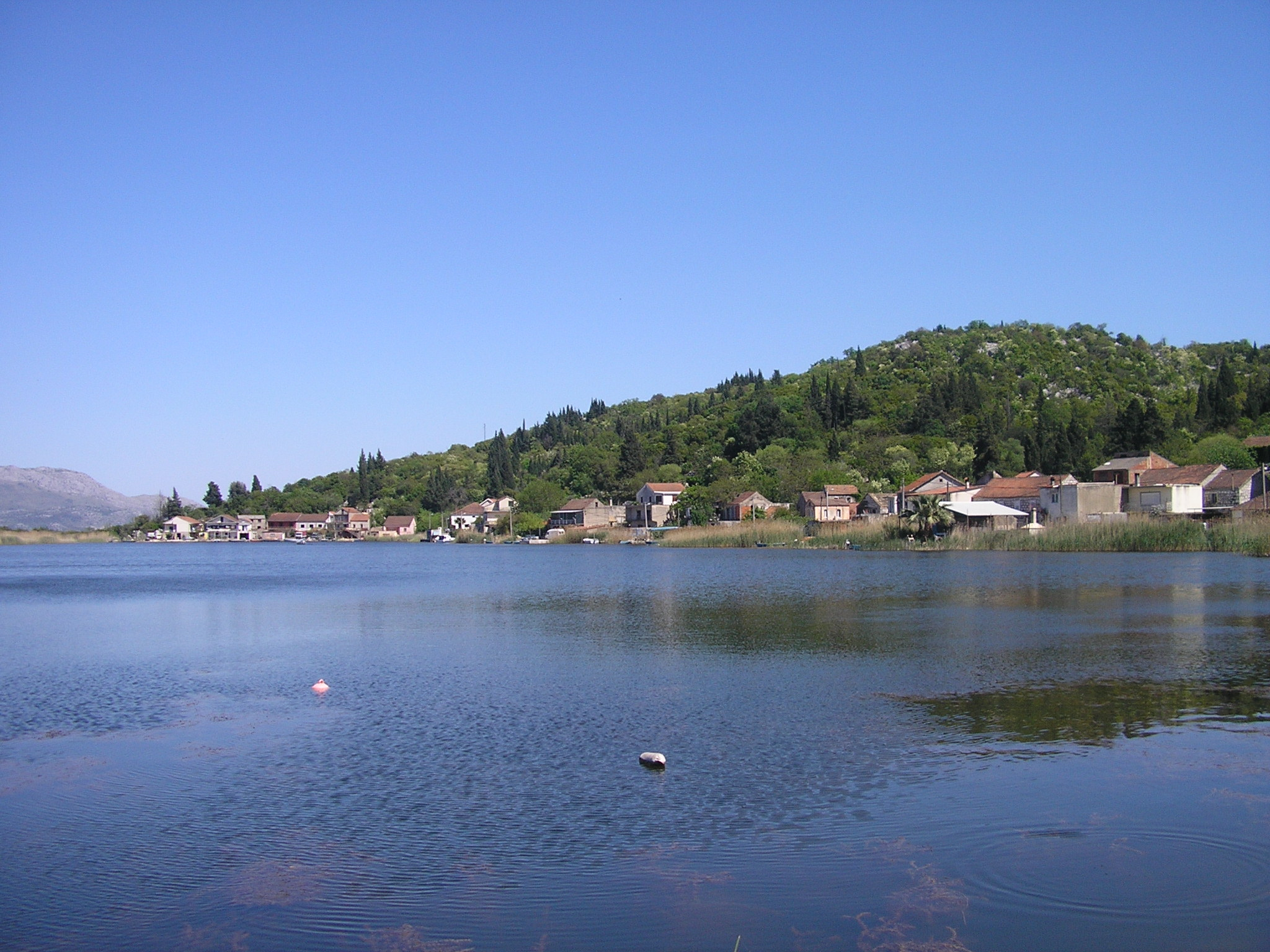

- Location within Croatia
- Coordinates: 42°59′25″N 17°29′50″E
- Country: Croatia
- County: Dubrovnik-Neretva County
- Municipality: Slivno

Area
  - Total: 0.39 sq mi (1.0 km^{2})

Population (2021)
  - Total: 121
  - Density: 310/sq mi (120/km^{2})
- Time zone: UTC+1 (CET)
  - Summer (DST): UTC+2 (CEST)
- Postal code: 20357 Blace
- Area code: +385 020
- Vehicle registration: DU

Mihalj is a village in the Slivno municipality of the Dubrovnik-Neretva County, Croatia.

== History ==
It was established as Mihalj-Kremena in 1948. In 2001, maritime Kremena and Lučina were established out of territory (former hamlets) of Mihalj.

== Demographics ==
According to the 2021 census, its population was 121.

=== Demographic history ===
According to the 1991 census, the village had 220 inhabitants, divided by ethnic identification as: Serbs (48,18%), Croats (41,81%), Yugoslavs (7,72%). In 2001, it had 212 inhabitants in 59 households. According to the 2011 census, the village had 156 inhabitants.
