= Klek (peninsula) =

Peninsula of Bosnia and Herzegovina in Adriatic Sea

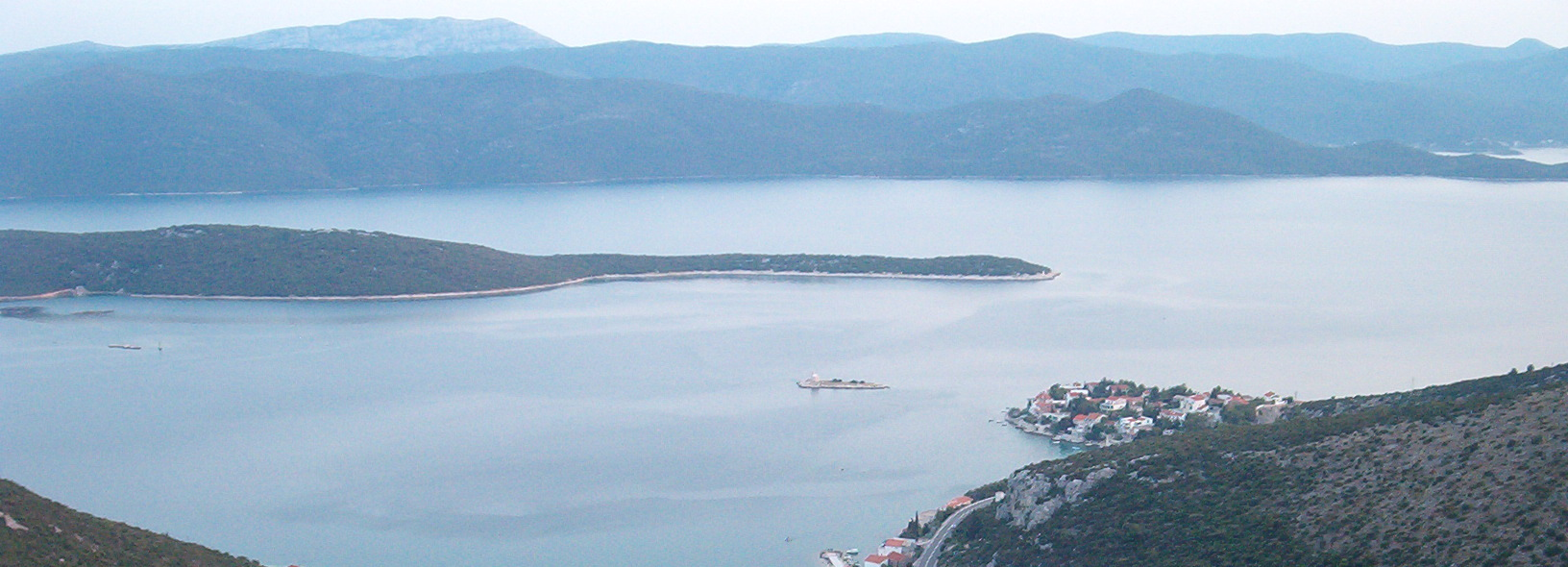
- The disputed tip of the peninsula seen from the mainland, with the Lopata islet (left) and larger landmass of Pelješac (background)

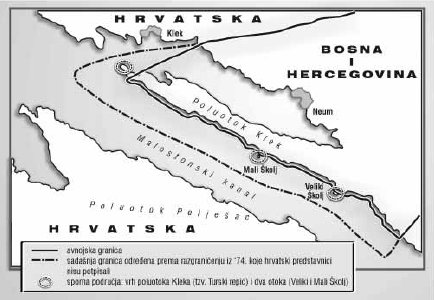

Geography
- Location: Adriatic Sea
- Coordinates: 42.919224°N 17.591658°E
- Archipelago: Neum-Klek

Administration
- Bosnia and Herzegovina/Croatia
- Entity: Federation of Bosnia and Herzegovina
- Canton/županija: Herzegovina-Neretva-Canton/Dubrovačko-neretvanska županija
- Municipality: Neum

Demographics
- Population: ?

Klek is a peninsula of indeterminate length in the Adriatic Sea located southwest of Neum, Bosnia and Herzegovina. It encloses the Bay of Neum, separating it from the larger Bay of Mali Ston and the Pelješac peninsula in Croatia. At the cape of the peninsula, a few hundred meters from the shore, is a small islet as part of a reef consisting series of bare rocks appearing under the water table (Serbo-Croatian: hrid, hridina). It is called Lopata, and at the tip of the reef there is a lighthouse, also called Lopata. At the very tip of the peninsula, there is another lighthouse, called Rep Kleka.

The tip of the peninsula, known as Rep Kleka (also known as Ponta repa and Turski rep), that lies directly across the eponymous village of Klek in Croatia, is disputed between Bosnia and Herzegovina and Croatia; they last negotiated its status in the 1999 Neum Agreement, which was not ratified.

== See also ==
- Veliki Školj
- Mali Školj
- List of lighthouses in Bosnia and Herzegovina

== Sources ==
- Arnaut, Damir (2014). "Adriatic Blues: Delimiting the Former Yugoslavia's Final Frontier". In Clive H. Schofield; Seokwoo Lee; Moon-Sang Kwon (eds.). The Limits of Maritime Jurisdiction. Leiden: Koninklijke Brill NV (Martinus Nijhoff Publishers, 2013). pp. 160–164. ISBN 9789004262591.
- Klemenčić, Mladen (2000). "The border agreement between Croatia and Bosnia-Herzegovina: The first but not the last" (pdf). International Boundaries Research Unit (in English and Serbo-Croatian) (Winter 1999-2000). Durham.
