= Mali Školj =

Island in Bosnia and Herzegovina

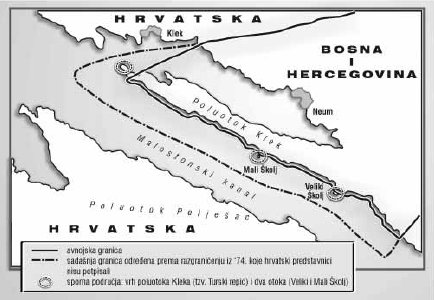

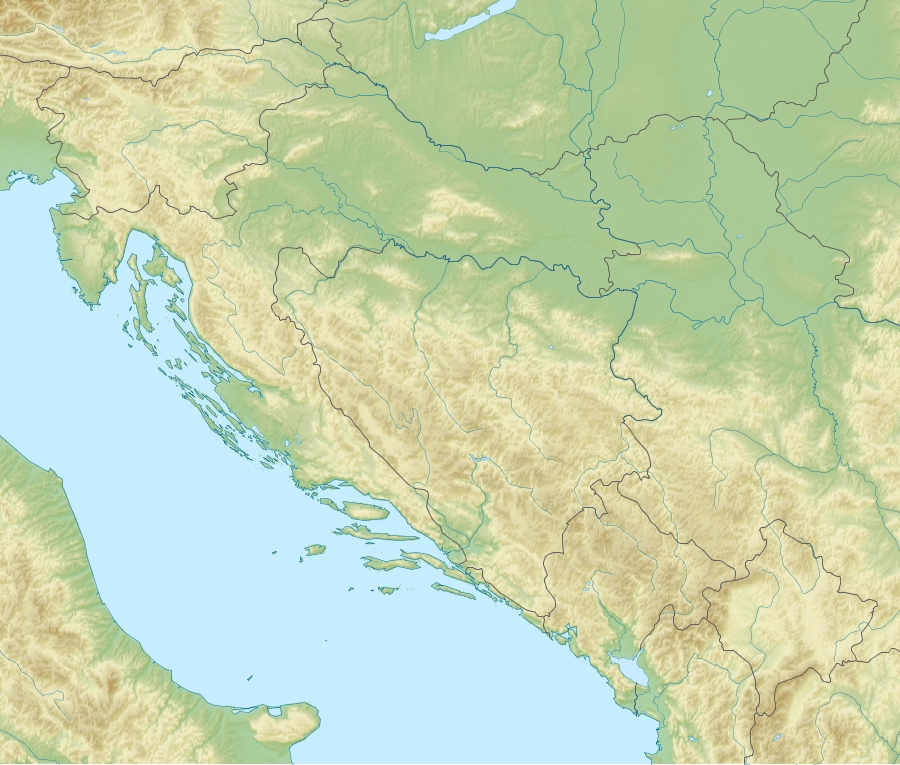
- Location within Bosnia and Herzegovina Location within Dinaric Alps

Geography
- Location: Adriatic Sea
- Coordinates: 42.91149°N 17.59868°E
- Archipelago: Neum-Klek

Administration
- Bosnia and Herzegovina
- Entity: Federation of Bosnia and Herzegovina
- Canton: Herzegovina-Neretva
- Municipality: Neum

Demographics
- Population: 0

Mali Školj is uninhabited islet in the Bay of Mali Ston, located in Bosnia and Herzegovina, and with the nearby islet of Veliki Školj makes the only two Bosnia and Herzegovina's islands in the Adriatic Sea.

The temporary regime of the sea border between Croatia and Bosnia and Herzegovina was determined in 1999. The Neum Agreement on the temporary border was signed by Franjo Tuđman and Alija Izetbegović, and has not been ratified due to the emergence of the controversy surrounding the ownership of these two islands and the tip of the Klek peninsula. Croatia disputes the validity of the agreement and claims it as its own territory.

== Sources ==
- Arnaut, Damir (2014). "Adriatic Blues: Delimiting the Former Yugoslavia's Final Frontier". In Clive H. Schofield; Seokwoo Lee; Moon-Sang Kwon (eds.). The Limits of Maritime Jurisdiction. Leiden: Koninklijke Brill NV (Martinus Nijhoff Publishers, 2013). pp. 160–164. ISBN 9789004262591.
