= Tuštevac =

- Village
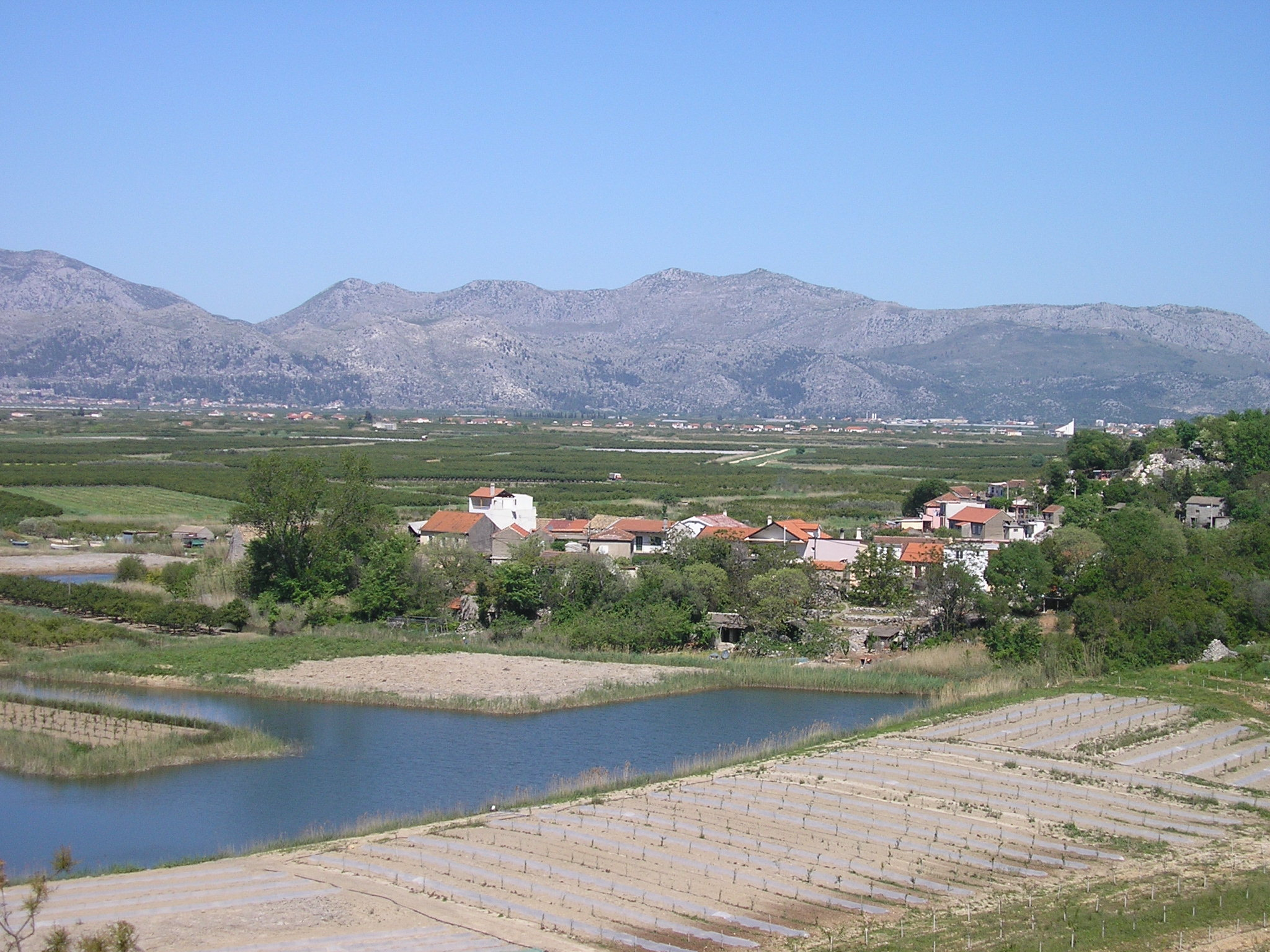

- Location within Croatia
- Coordinates: 42.9887°N 17.4987197°E
- Country: Croatia
- County: Dubrovnik-Neretva County
- Municipality: Slivno

Area
  - Total: 1.5 sq mi (4.0 km^{2})

Population (2021)
  - Total: 47
  - Density: 30/sq mi (12/km^{2})
- Time zone: UTC+1 (CET)
  - Summer (DST): UTC+2 (CEST)

Tuštevac is a village in Croatia.

== Demographics ==
According to the 2021 census, its population was 47.
