= Komarna =

Village in the Dubrovnik-Neretva County, Croatia

- Village
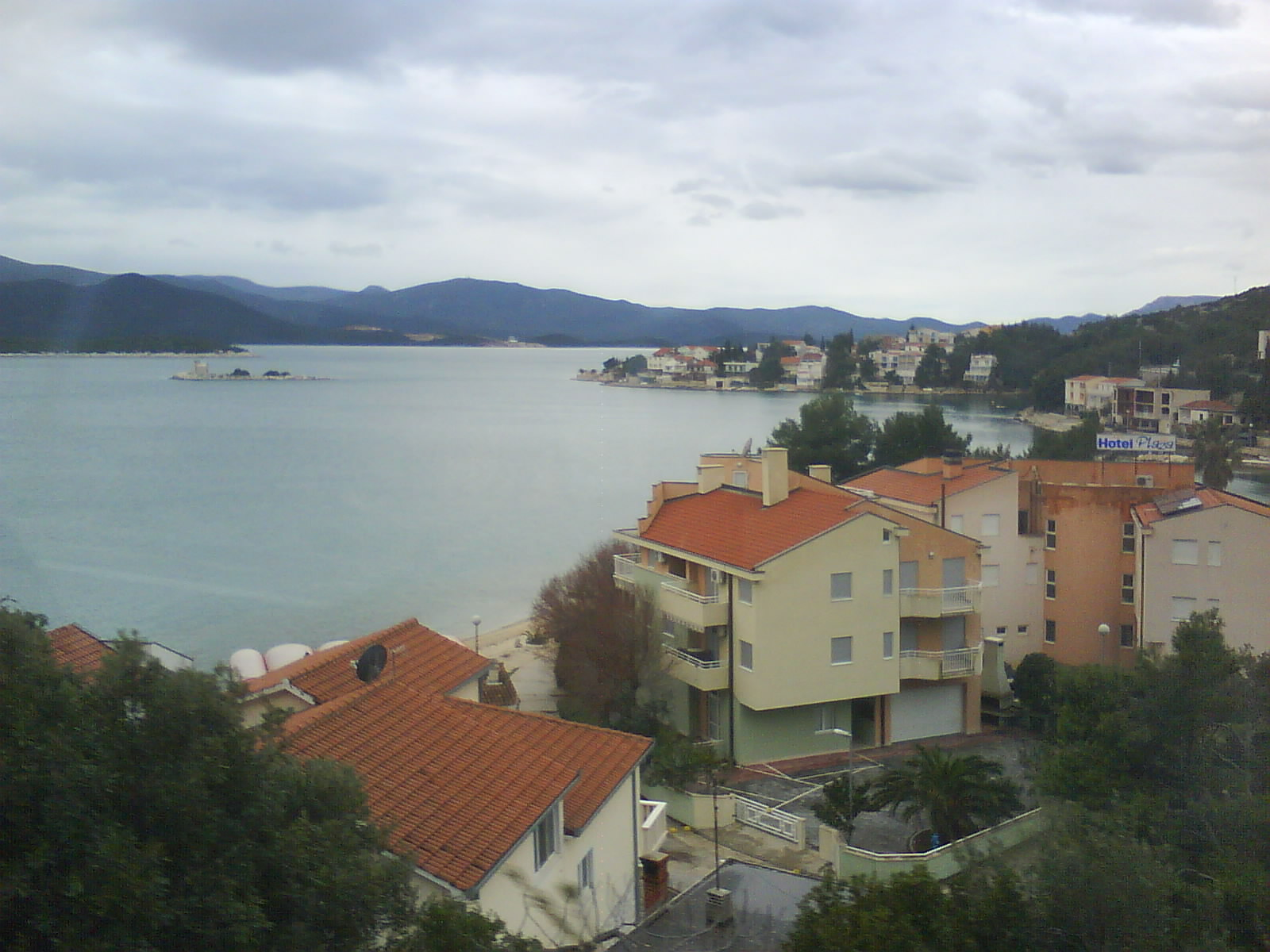

- Location within Croatia
- Coordinates: 42°56′43″N 17°32′1″E
- Country: Croatia
- County: Dubrovnik-Neretva County
- Municipality: Slivno

Area
  - Total: 0.66 sq mi (1.7 km^{2})

Population (2021)
  - Total: 412
  - Density: 630/sq mi (240/km^{2})
- Time zone: UTC+1 (CET)
  - Summer (DST): UTC+2 (CEST)

Komarna is a village in southern Dalmatia, Croatia, in the municipality of Slivno. It is the largest village in the municipality and located near the village of Klek.

The village is south of the Neretva Delta, 70 km north of Dubrovnik on the coast of Mali Ston Bay, overlooking the Pelješac peninsula, near the Pelješac Bridge.

== Demographics ==
According to the 2021 census, its population was 412. It was 167 in 2011.
