= Podgradina =

- Village
- Location within Croatia
- Coordinates: 42.987695°N 17.5172195°E
- Country: Croatia
- County: Dubrovnik-Neretva County
- Municipality: Slivno

Area
  - Total: 5.4 sq mi (14.1 km^{2})

Population (2021)
  - Total: 194
  - Density: 35.6/sq mi (13.8/km^{2})
- Time zone: UTC+1 (CET)
  - Summer (DST): UTC+2 (CEST)

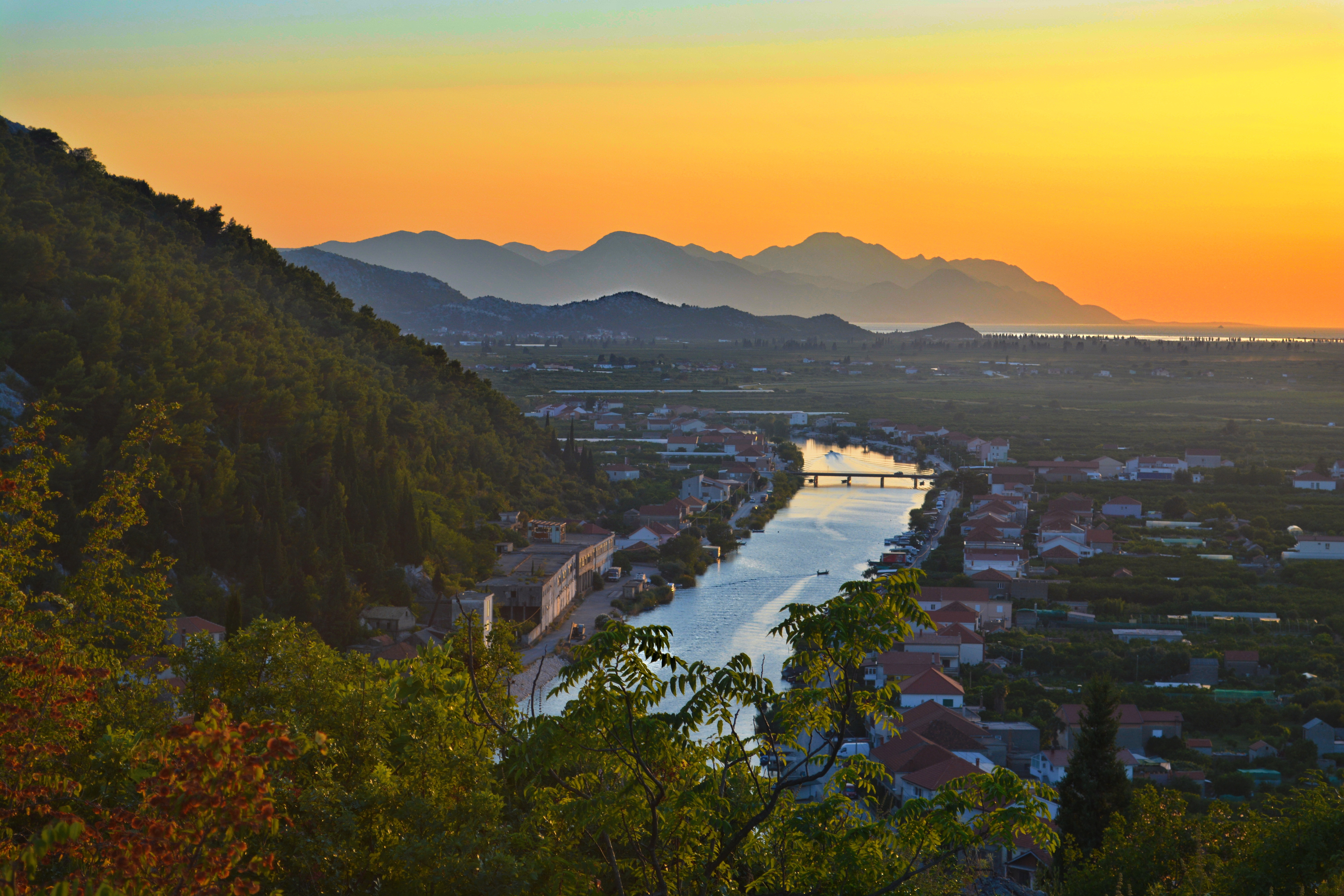
Podgradina and the Mala Neretva River

Podgradina is a village in Croatia.

== Demographics ==
According to the 2021 census, its population was 194.
