= Otok, Dubrovnik-Neretva County =

Otok
- Village
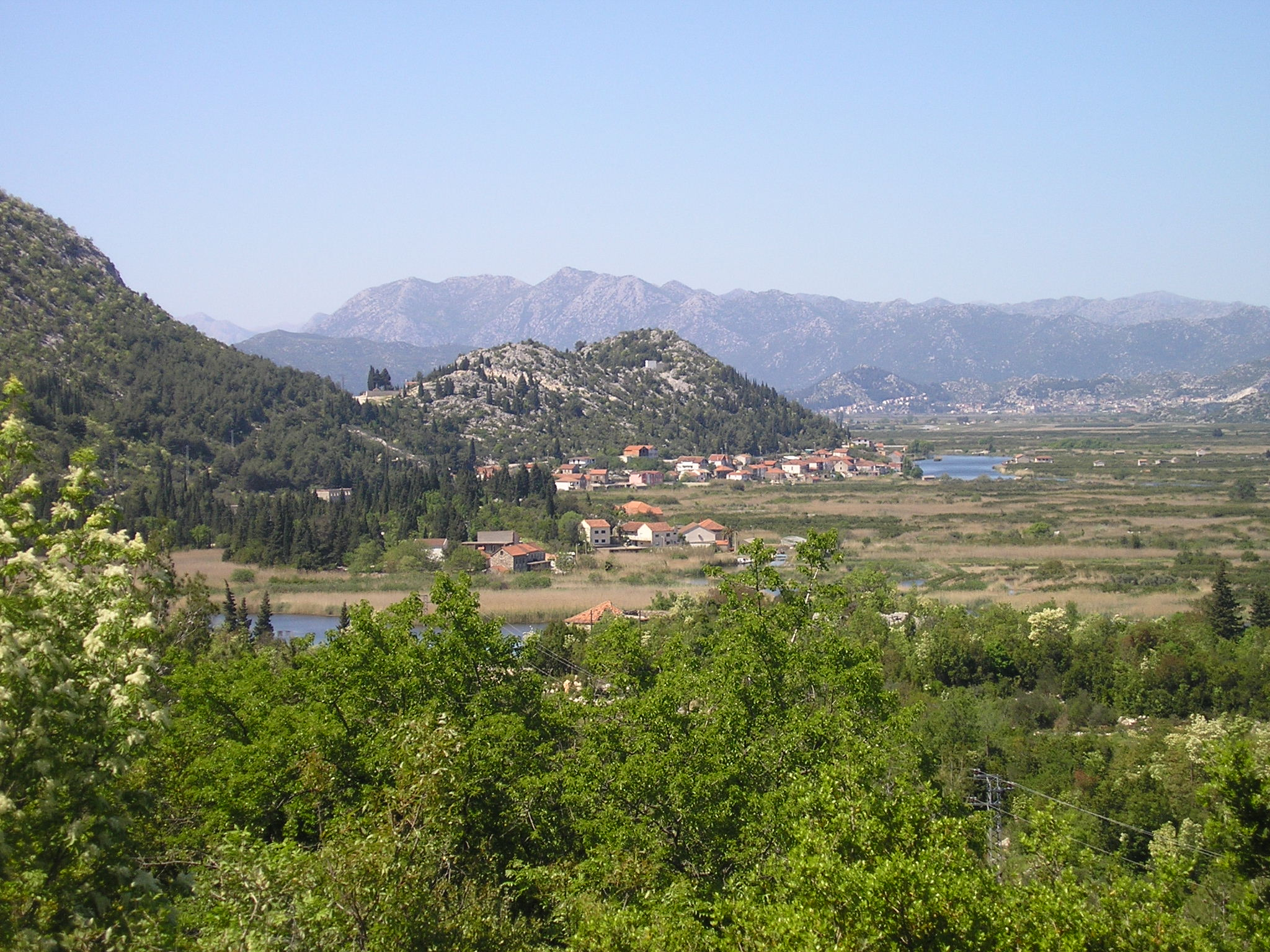
- Otok (in the forefront) and Trn

- Location within Croatia
- Coordinates: 42.9942932°N 17.4831375°E
- Country: Croatia
- County: Dubrovnik-Neretva County
- Municipality: Slivno

Area
  - Total: 0.50 sq mi (1.3 km^{2})

Population (2021)
  - Total: 47
  - Density: 94/sq mi (36/km^{2})
- Time zone: UTC+1 (CET)
  - Summer (DST): UTC+2 (CEST)

Otok is a village in Croatia.

== Demographics ==
According to the 2021 census, its population was 47.
