= Duboka, Slivno =

Duboka
- Village
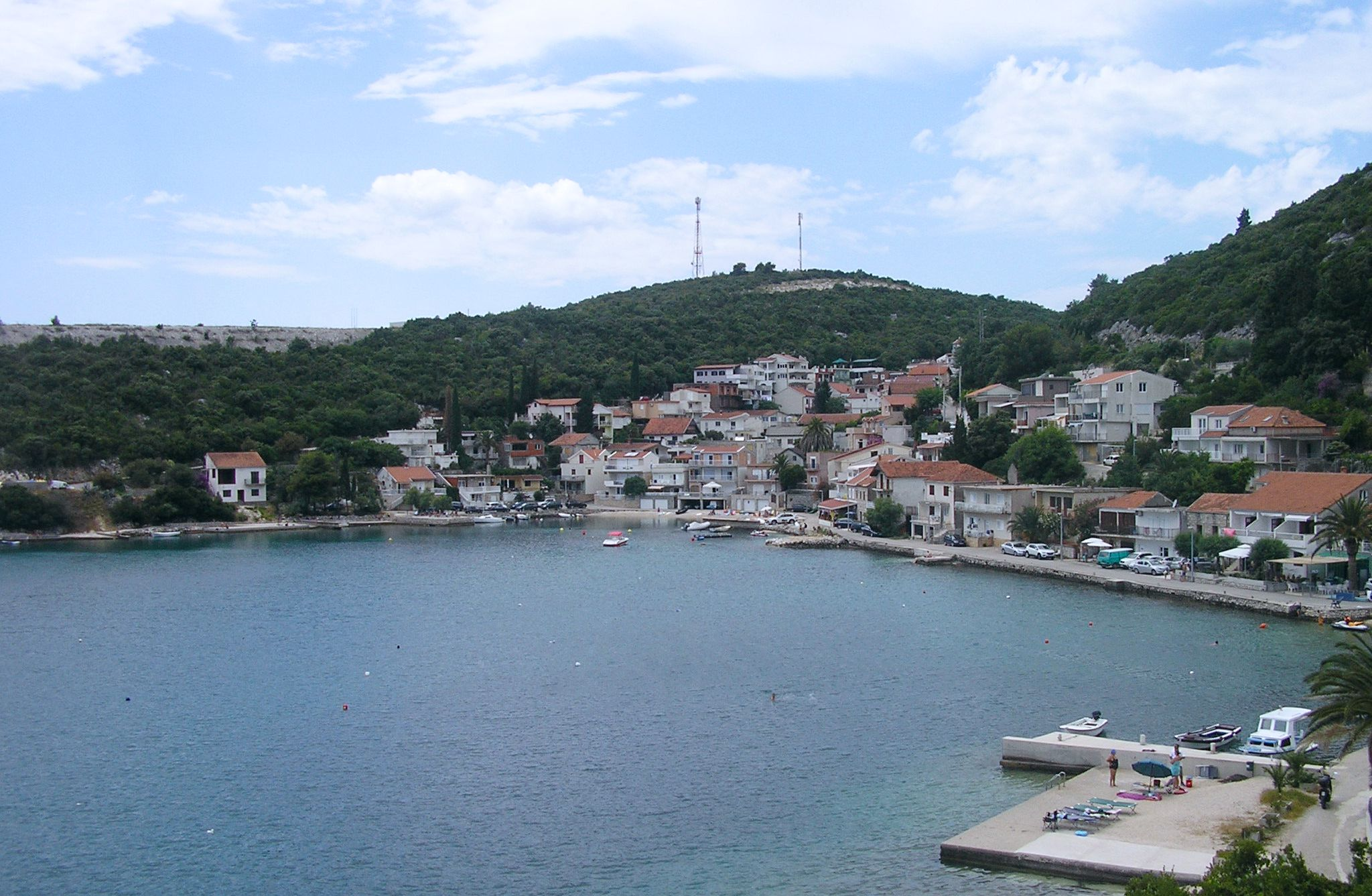

- Location within Croatia
- Coordinates: 42.9464113°N 17.5341266°E
- Country: Croatia
- County: Dubrovnik-Neretva County
- Municipality: Slivno

Area
  - Total: 0.35 sq mi (0.9 km^{2})

Population (2021)
  - Total: 266
  - Density: 770/sq mi (300/km^{2})
- Time zone: UTC+1 (CET)
  - Summer (DST): UTC+2 (CEST)

Duboka is a village in Croatia.

== Demographics ==
According to the 2021 census, its population was 266.

== Bibliography ==
=== Biology ===
- Šašić, Martina; Nahirnić, Ana; Tarmann, Gerhard M. (2016-12-31). "Zygaenidae (Lepidoptera) in the Lepidoptera collections of the Croatian Natural History Museum". Natura Croatica: Periodicum Musei Historiae Naturalis Croatici. 25 (2): 233–248. doi:10.20302/NC.2016.25.19. eISSN 1848-7386.
