= Lovorje =

- Village
- Location within Croatia
- Coordinates: 42.9744777°N 17.5167882°E
- Country: Croatia
- County: Dubrovnik-Neretva County
- Municipality: Slivno

Area
  - Total: 0.54 sq mi (1.4 km^{2})

Population (2021)
  - Total: 58
  - Density: 110/sq mi (41/km^{2})
- Time zone: UTC+1 (CET)
  - Summer (DST): UTC+2 (CEST)

Lovorje is a village in Croatia.

== Demographics ==
According to the 2021 census, its population was 58.
