= Halil Tikveša =

Halil Tikveša (born in 1935, Šurmanci) is a contemporary Bosnian visual artist. Tikveša graduated from the Academy of Fine Arts in Belgrade, Serbia in 1961. From 1976 to 2000 Tikveša lectured on graphics/painting at the Novi Sad Art Academy. Several of his works are part of the permanent collection of the National Gallery of Bosnia and Herzegovina in Sarajevo.

Beginning from 1962 he was drawing paintings, graphics, engravings, collages and objects. His paintings were exhibited more than 60 times in his personal exhibitions. He also took part in different exhibitions and biennale: Crakow (1966 and 1968), Bradford (1968 and 1982), Lugano (1968), Paris (1968), São Paulo (1969), Berlin (1970), Alexandria (1970) Fredrikstad (1980 и 1982), Heidelberg (1979), Cittadella (1979), Ljubljana (1971, 1973, 1975, 1977 1981, 1985, 1987), Ankara (1986), Kyoto (1987), New-Delhi (1988).

He is a winner of more than 25 awards. He lives in Belgrade, Sarajevo and Blace. Since 2013 he is an honorable professor of the Novi Sad Art Academy.
