= Kremena =

- Village
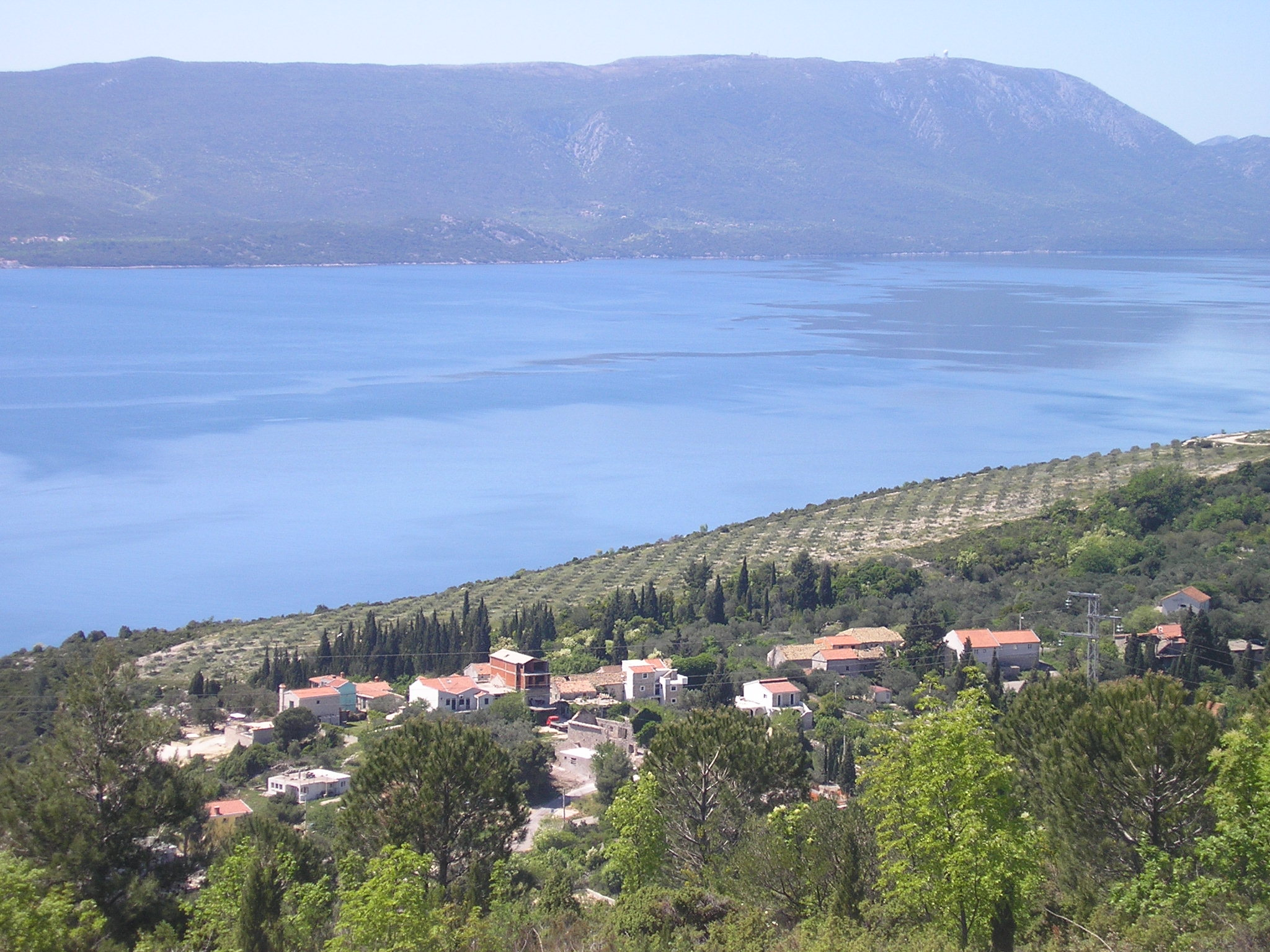

- Location within Croatia
- Coordinates: 42.9762922°N 17.4871354°E
- Country: Croatia
- County: Dubrovnik-Neretva County
- Municipality: Slivno

Area
  - Total: 0.58 sq mi (1.5 km^{2})

Population (2021)
  - Total: 28
  - Density: 48/sq mi (19/km^{2})
- Time zone: UTC+1 (CET)
  - Summer (DST): UTC+2 (CEST)

Kremena is a village in Croatia.

== Demographics ==
According to the 2021 census, its population was 28.
