= Vlaka, Dubrovnik-Neretva County =

Vlaka
- Village
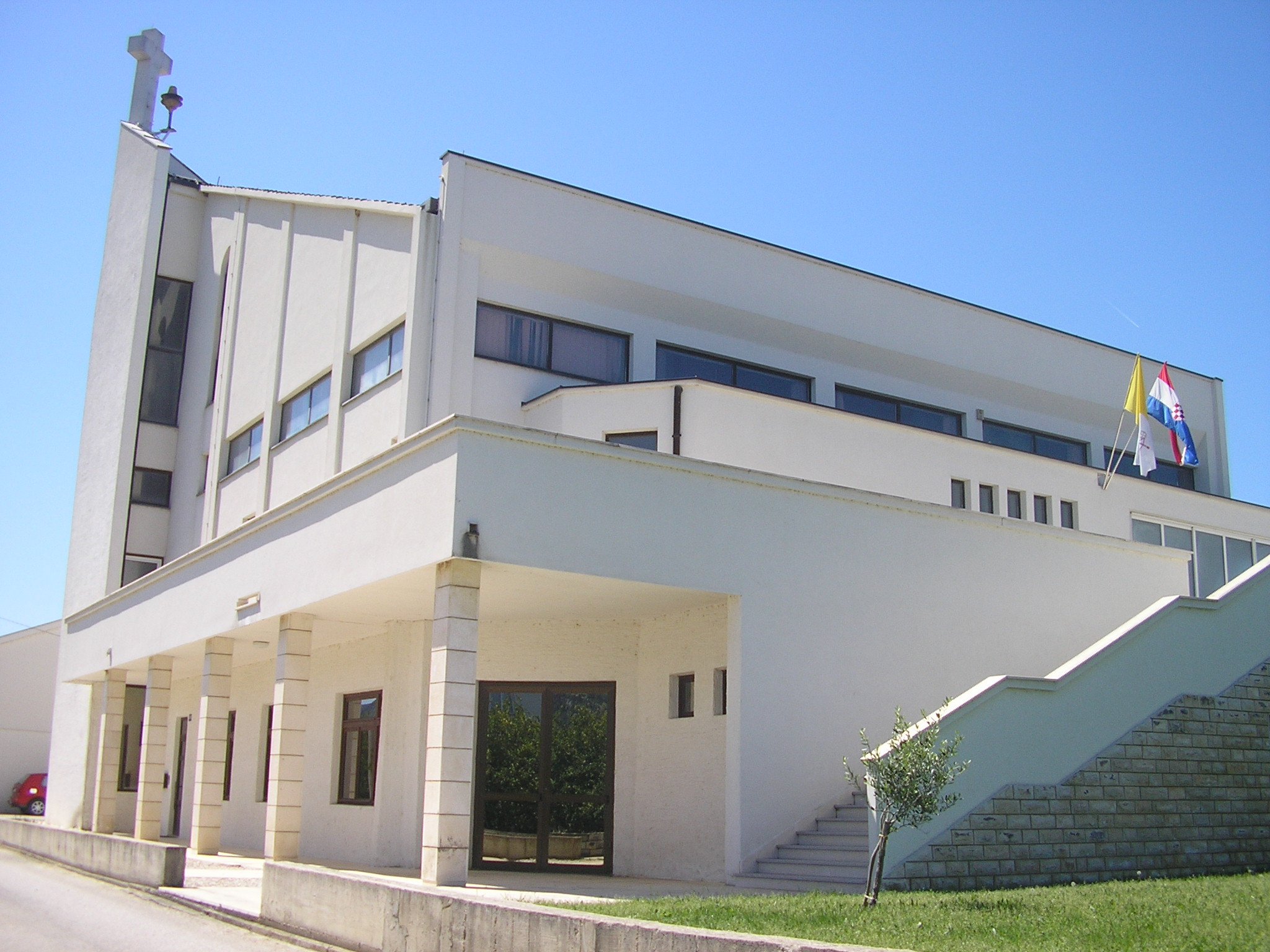
- Church of Our Lady of Health in Vlaka

- Location within Croatia
- Coordinates: 42.995829°N 17.5155539°E
- Country: Croatia
- County: Dubrovnik-Neretva County
- Municipality: Slivno

Area
  - Total: 1.5 sq mi (4.0 km^{2})

Population (2021)
  - Total: 268
  - Density: 170/sq mi (67/km^{2})
- Time zone: UTC+1 (CET)
  - Summer (DST): UTC+2 (CEST)

Vlaka is a village in Croatia.

== Demographics ==
According to the 2021 census, its population was 268.
