= Slivno, Dubrovnik-Neretva County =

Slivno
- Municipality
- Općina Slivno
- Interactive map of Slivno
- Location within Croatia
- Coordinates: 42.967477°N 17.53365°E
- Country: Croatia
- County: Dubrovnik-Neretva County

Government
  - Municipal mayor: Smiljan Mustapić

Area
  - Total: 52.8 km^{2} (20.4 sq mi)

Population (2021)
  - Total: 2,046
  - Density: 38.8/km^{2} (100/sq mi)
- Time zone: UTC+1 (CET)
  - Summer (DST): UTC+2 (CEST)
- Postal code: 20357
- Area code: 020
- Website: opcina-slivno.hr

Slivno is a municipality in the Dubrovnik-Neretva County in south Croatia.

== Demographics ==
In 2011, the municipality had a population of 1,999, with the absolute majority of Croats (93.7%).

In 2021, the municipality had 2,046 residents in the following 18 settlements:

- Blace, population 273
- Duba, population 4
- Duboka, population 266
- Klek, population 177
- Komarna, population 412
- Kremena, population 28
- Lovorje, population 58
- Lučina, population 10
- Mihalj, population 121
- Otok, population 47
- Pižinovac, population 1
- Podgradina, population 194
- Raba, population 8
- Slivno Ravno, population 1
- Trn, population 131
- Tuštevac, population 47
- Vlaka, population 268
- Zavala, population 0
Slivno: Population trends 1857–2021
v

population	1107	1272	1427	1641	1887	2247	2194	2437	2659	2656	2580	2110	1838	1665	2078	1999	2046
	1857	1869	1880	1890	1900	1910	1921	1931	1948	1953	1961	1971	1981	1991	2001	2011	2021

Sources: Croatian Bureau of Statistics publications
