= Blace, Croatia =

Blace
- Village
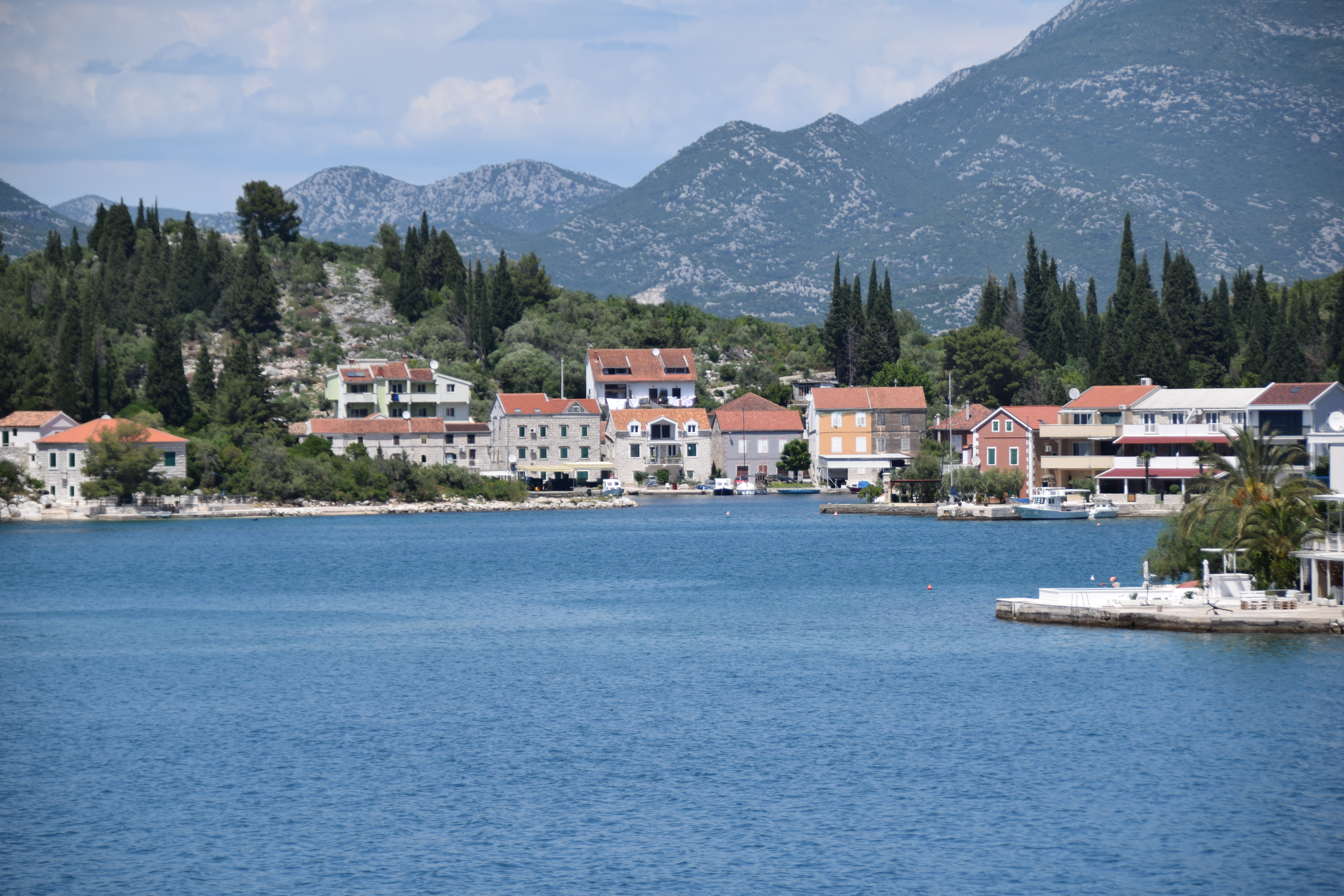
- View of Blace

- Location within Croatia
- Country: Croatia
- County: Dubrovnik-Neretva County
- Municipality: Slivno

Area
  - Total: 1.1 sq mi (2.8 km^{2})

Population (2021)
  - Total: 273
  - Density: 250/sq mi (98/km^{2})
- Time zone: UTC+1 (CET)
  - Summer (DST): UTC+2 (CEST)

Blace is a small village in Croatia. The village is located in a small bay in the southern side of Neretva Delta. The nearby cities include Ploče and Opuzen. The huge beach, a few kilometers north from the village, is well-known for kitesurfing due to its shallow water.

There is no hotel in the village but a majority of houses offer private rooms for rental.

== Demographics ==
According to the 2021 census, its population was 273.
