= Klek, Croatia =

Klek Clesto
- Village
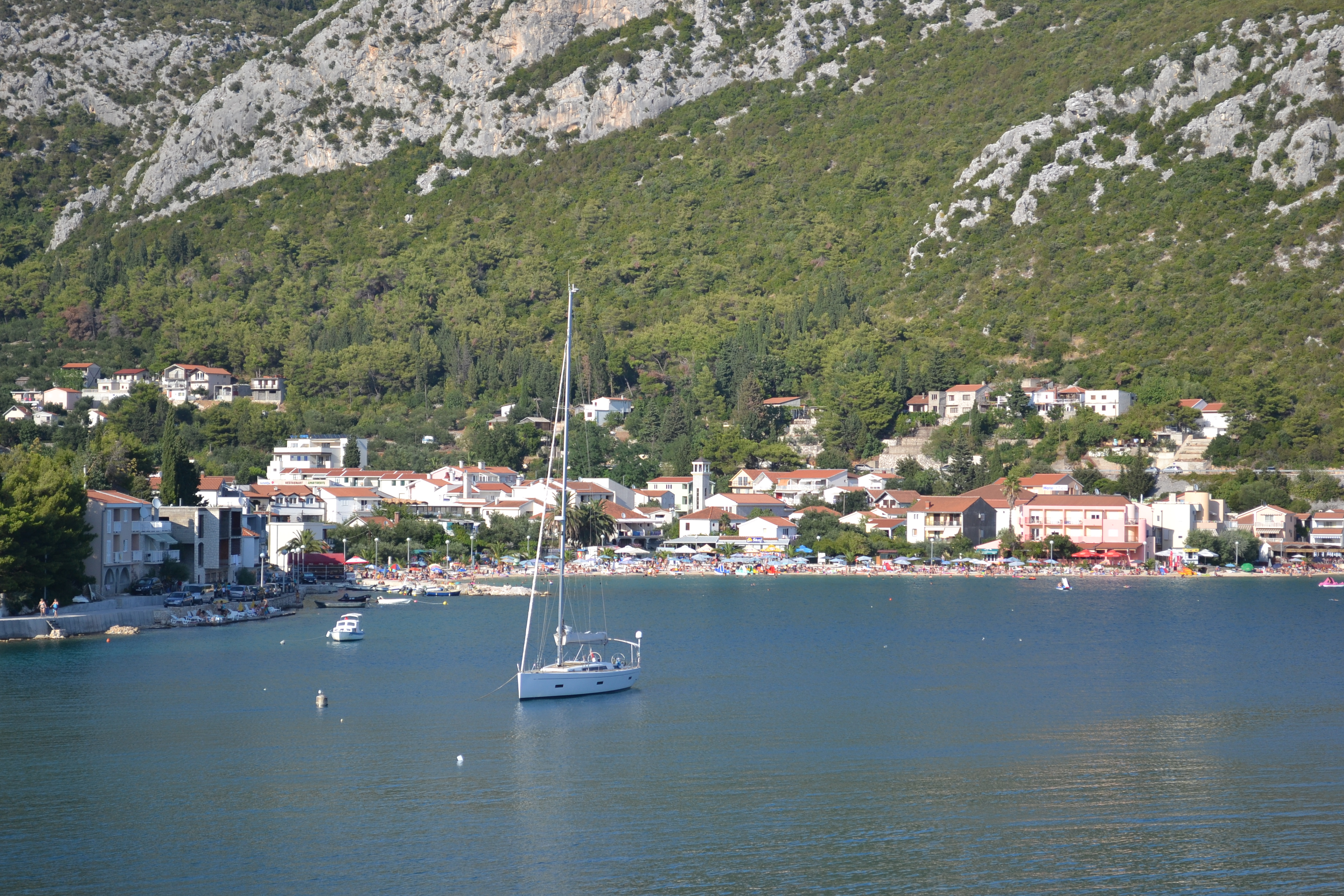

- Location within Croatia
- Coordinates: 42°56′47″N 17°33′52″E
- Country: Croatia
- County: Dubrovnik-Neretva County
- Municipality: Slivno

Area
  - Total: 0.89 sq mi (2.3 km^{2})

Population (2021)
  - Total: 177
  - Density: 200/sq mi (77/km^{2})
- Time zone: UTC+1 (CET)
  - Summer (DST): UTC+2 (CEST)

Klek (Italian: Clesto) is a village along the Adriatic Sea in southern Dalmatia, Croatia. It is a tourist locality, located in the municipality of Slivno and near the village of Komarna and the town of Neum, across the border in Bosnia and Herzegovina, right across the peninsula of Klek.

== Demographics ==
According to the 2021 census, its population was 177. It was 230 in 2011.

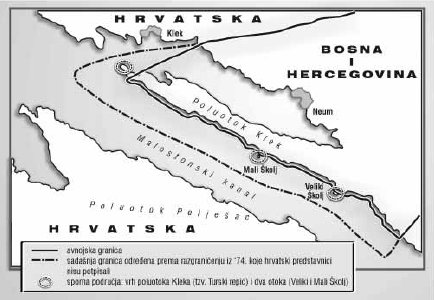
Borders of Bosnia Herzegovina near Neum as modified according to the 1999 agreement
