= The Rail Network =

One of the TVs used

The Rail Network (TRN) is the first television and radio network broadcasting digital video with multiple channels of some audio to passengers on mass transit subway and rail systems. TRN launched its network in 2005 on Metropolitan Atlanta Rapid Transit Authority (MARTA) rail cars which enables the delivery of digital video and audio content including news, sports, weather, music and entertainment programs – broadcast in multiple languages and updated regularly throughout the day.

== Overview ==
TRN furnishes each rail car with multiple flat screen televisions displaying a digital picture with closed captioning. The news programming is provided by a local network affiliate in each market. The television broadcast follows the same format as any half-hour of network television: 20.5 minutes of content and 9.5 minutes of advertising dispersed throughout the half-hour.

Audio is accessible wirelessly through any FM radio receiver tuned to TRN's on-board FM network. Passengers can choose to listen to the news in English or Spanish, music channels playing different genres, or a dedicated station that the local transit authority uses to provide updated travel, operations, and emergency information. TRN will provide free FM radios to passengers throughout the launch period in each market.

TRN has a ten-year exclusive agreement with MARTA to install, maintain, and operate TRN's network on MARTA trains while providing this service at no cost to the passengers or MARTA. TRN is also in discussions with several other transit authorities regarding the implementation of the network on their systems.

== Acquisition by CBS Corporation ==
CBS Corporation acquired The Rail Network, Inc. in July 2007, renaming it CBS Outdoor Rail Network.
