= Trn, Croatia =

Trn
- Village
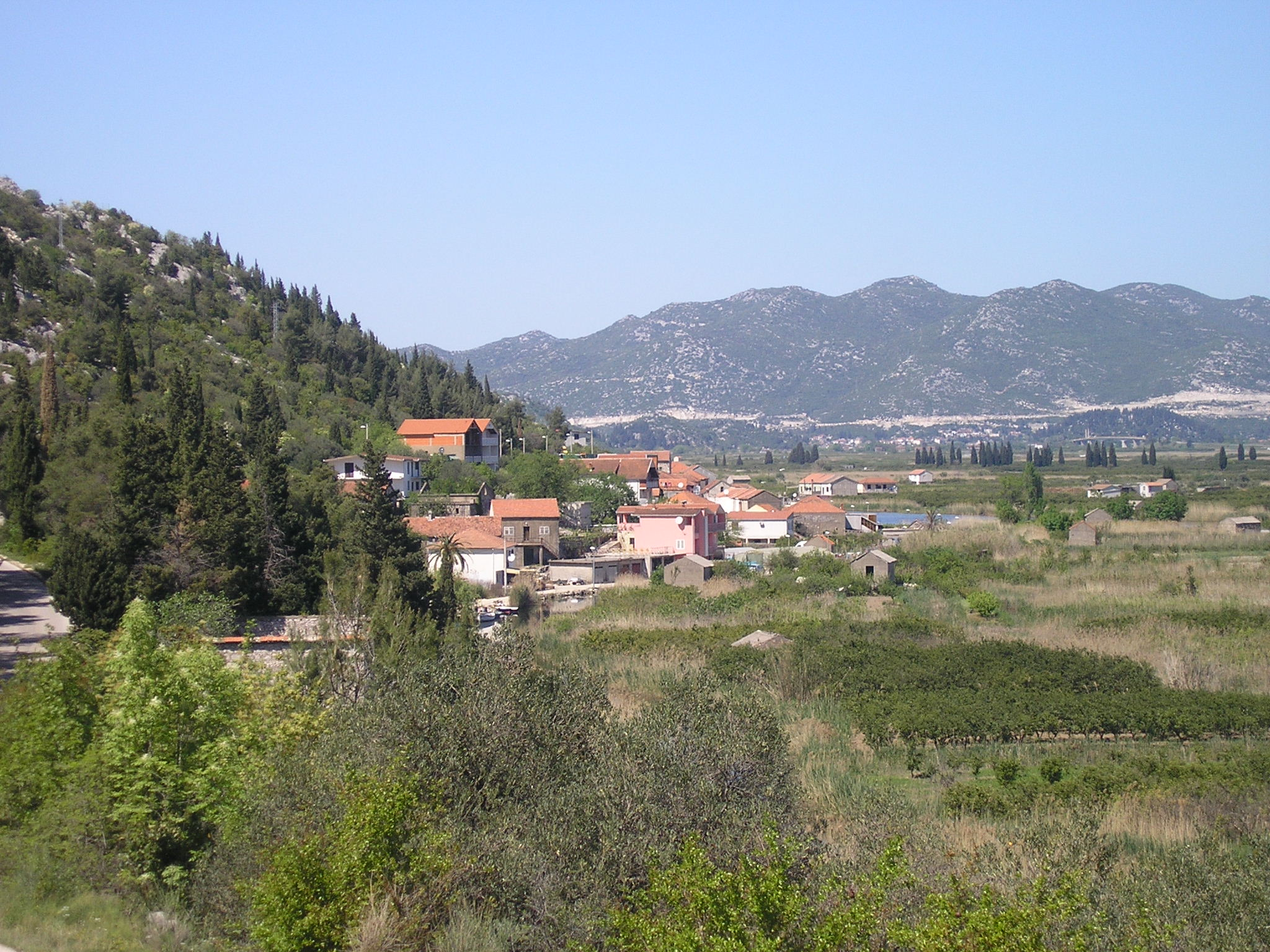

- Location within Croatia
- Coordinates: 43.0094446°N 17.4630578°E
- Country: Croatia
- County: Dubrovnik-Neretva County
- Municipality: Slivno

Area
  - Total: 0.15 sq mi (0.4 km^{2})

Population (2021)
  - Total: 131
  - Density: 850/sq mi (330/km^{2})
- Time zone: UTC+1 (CET)
  - Summer (DST): UTC+2 (CEST)

Trn is a village in Croatia.

== Demographics ==
According to the 2021 census, its population was 131.
