= Trn, Velika Kladuša =

Trn Трн
- Village
- Location within Bosnia and Herzegovina
- Coordinates: 45.157402°N 15.815105°E
- Country: Bosnia and Herzegovina
- Entity: Federation of Bosnia and Herzegovina
- Canton: Una-Sana
- Municipality: Velika Kladuša

Area
  - Total: 0.58 sq mi (1.50 km^{2})

Population (2013)
  - Total: 376
  - Density: 649/sq mi (251/km^{2})
- Time zone: UTC+1 (CET)
  - Summer (DST): UTC+2 (CEST)

Trn is a village in the municipality of Velika Kladuša, Bosnia and Herzegovina.

== Demographics ==
According to the 2013 census, its population was 376.

Ethnicity in 2013
Ethnicity	Number	Percentage
Bosniaks	342	91.0%
Croats	3	0.8%
Serbs	1	0.3%
other/undeclared	30	8.0%
Total	376	100%
