= Neum Agreement =

1998 unimplemented treaty between Croatia and Bosnia

Map of the Neum strip and the adjacent areas of Croatia.

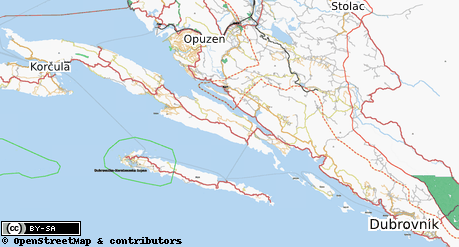
Map of the Neum strip and the adjacent areas, including major roads. Croatia/Bosnia-Herzegovina border is marked with a dashed red line.

The Neum Agreement is an unimplemented treaty between Croatia and Bosnia and Herzegovina granting free passage of Croatian transit traffic between parts of the territory of Dubrovnik-Neretva County. This involves the area around the city of Dubrovnik to the rest of the county, which would form a pene-exclave within the Dubrovnik-Neretva County at the municipality of Neum.

The agreement was signed in Zagreb, Croatia on 22 November 1998 and followed by a protocol of 11 December 2001 further regulating the issue. The agreement provides for unobstructed transit of vehicles with Croatian license plates and documents traveling from and to Croatian territory, and prohibits loading or unloading of goods or passengers and changes of mode of transportation except in cases of traffic accidents or vehicle breakdowns, but allows officials of Bosnia and Herzegovina to prohibit transit of goods whose import is not permitted due to health concerns. The agreement finally provides that it shall be in force as long as the Ploče Agreement, regulating use of the Port of Ploče by Bosnia and Herzegovina, is implemented.

As of 2012, the treaty is still not ratified (it was not published in Narodne novine) and there is no actual route permitting the type of transit provided for by the agreement where vehicles would not stop for border controls in the area. However, one lane at the border is designed to declare that the traveler is only transiting between parts of Croatia, and those driving in this lane are usually not stopped for border control.

Currently the Klek/Neum 1 and Neum 2/Zaton Doli border crossings on the D8 state road are open to international road traffic, whereas Vukov Klanac and Imotica border checkpoints are open to local traffic only. The Pelješac peninsula, utilising the Pelješac Bridge, forms an alternative route since the peninsula is part of Croatia.

== See also ==
- Motorway construction in the area: A1 (Croatia) § Further construction
- Transport in Croatia
- Pelješac Bridge
