= Bay of Mali Ston =

Bay in the Adriatic Sea

Coordinates: 42°55′59″N 17°31′54″E

- Interactive map of Bay of Mali Ston

Bay of Mali Ston (Croatian: Malostonski zaljev) is a bay in the Adriatic Sea, enclosed by the Pelješac peninsula and the mainland. The name primarily refers to the innermost, eastern part of the bay, while the name Channel of Mali Ston (Croatian: Malostonski kanal) is used for the channel between the peninsulas of Klek and Pelješac, in the west. The two bodies of water are located in Croatia's and partly in Bosnia and Herzegovina's territorial waters.

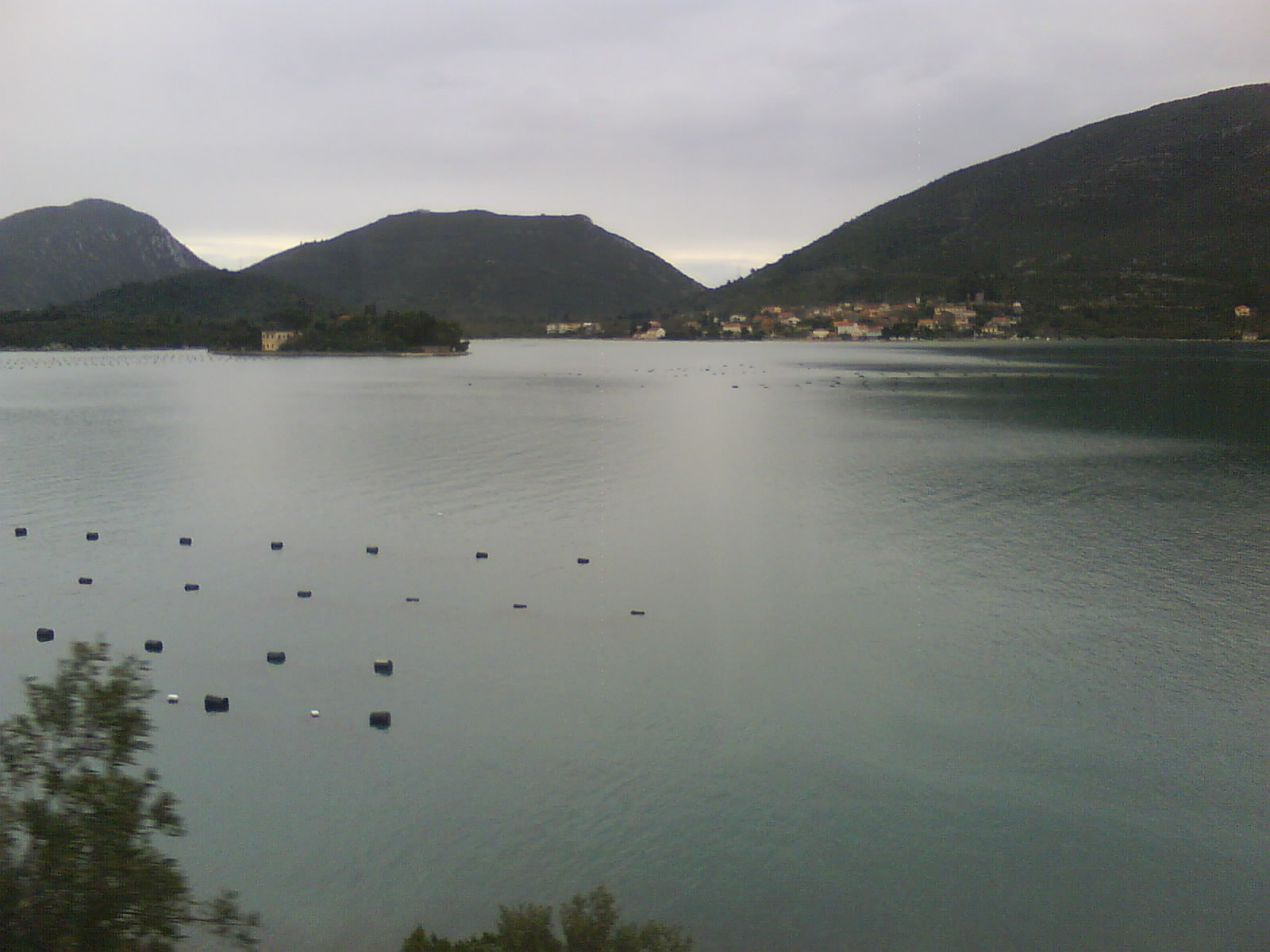
Shellfish farming in the bay.

The bay is named after the village of Mali Ston (near Ston). Its southernmost point is at the isthmus of the Pelješac peninsula, while its mouth is located roughly north of Hodilje. The Channel, in turn, extends from there to the line between Cape Blaca on Pelješac and Cape Međed on the shore, located south of Komarna. The sea to the west of the Mali Ston Channel, in-between Duba Stonska and the Neretva Delta, is called the Malo more, and further west is finally the Neretva Delta, which lies in-between Duba (Općina Slivno) and Ploče.

The bay is 21 km (13 mi; 11 nmi) long and has a maximum breadth of 2.2 km (1.4 mi; 1.2 nmi) and the depth is between 7 and 28 metres (23 and 92 ft). On account of its clean waters, the bay of Mali Ston was declared a Special Natural Reserve in 1983. An area of 4821 ha is covered, from the line Sreser-Duba eastwards. The Croatian Ministry of Agriculture considers this larger body of water as the total area of the bay for the purposes of regulating mariculture, with a length of 28 km (17 mi; 15 nmi), a maximum breadth of 6.1 km (3.8 mi; 3.3 nmi), and the depth largely between 20 and 29 metres (66 and 95 ft) meters.

The part of the bay that is in Bosnia and Herzegovina is a section in the northwest of the bay near Neum, and it also constitutes said country's only coastline. The maritime boundary between the two is, according to the common standards for territorial waters, an equidistant line between the Pelješac peninsula of Croatia in the southwest and the Klek peninsula in Bosnia and Herzegovina in the northeast.

The Pelješac Bridge is located in the far west of the channel.

The climate of the area is Mediterranean, characterized by mild winters and dry summers, with three times more rain in the rainier than in the drier months, during which the mean precipitation do not exceed 40 mm (1.57 in). The mean yearly precipitation observed is of 1316 mm (51.8). The dominant winds come from the north, north-east and north-west. The average sea temperature (as observed in Neum) ranges from 13 °C (55 °F) in January to 28 °C (82 °F) in July and August.

The bay is under the intermittent influence of fresh water from the river Neretva, naturally more pronounced in its outer and central parts and during the season of high discharge and/or strong Western winds. Yet, the dominant influence is that of abundant submarine springs of fresh water from the surrounding coast. According to the concentration in nutrient salts and the quantity of phytoplankton, the bay may be characterized as a naturally mildly eutrophic system.

The bay hosts the largest oyster cultivation facilities in the Adriatic. Mussels are also part of the mariculture. The favorable hydrological conditions for seashell cultivation have been recognized since ancient times: remnants of oyster farming dating back to the Roman Empire have been found in the area; the first written documents on oyster gathering there are from the 16th century, and those which relate to seashell culture from the 17th, as recorded in the Republic of Ragusa.

In the 1980s, the bay's production was at an average of up to two million of oysters and 3,000 tonnes of mussels, accounting for 60% of the Croatian oyster production. The facilities were gravely damaged during the Croatian War of Independence.
