= Bosnia and Herzegovina–Croatia border =

International border

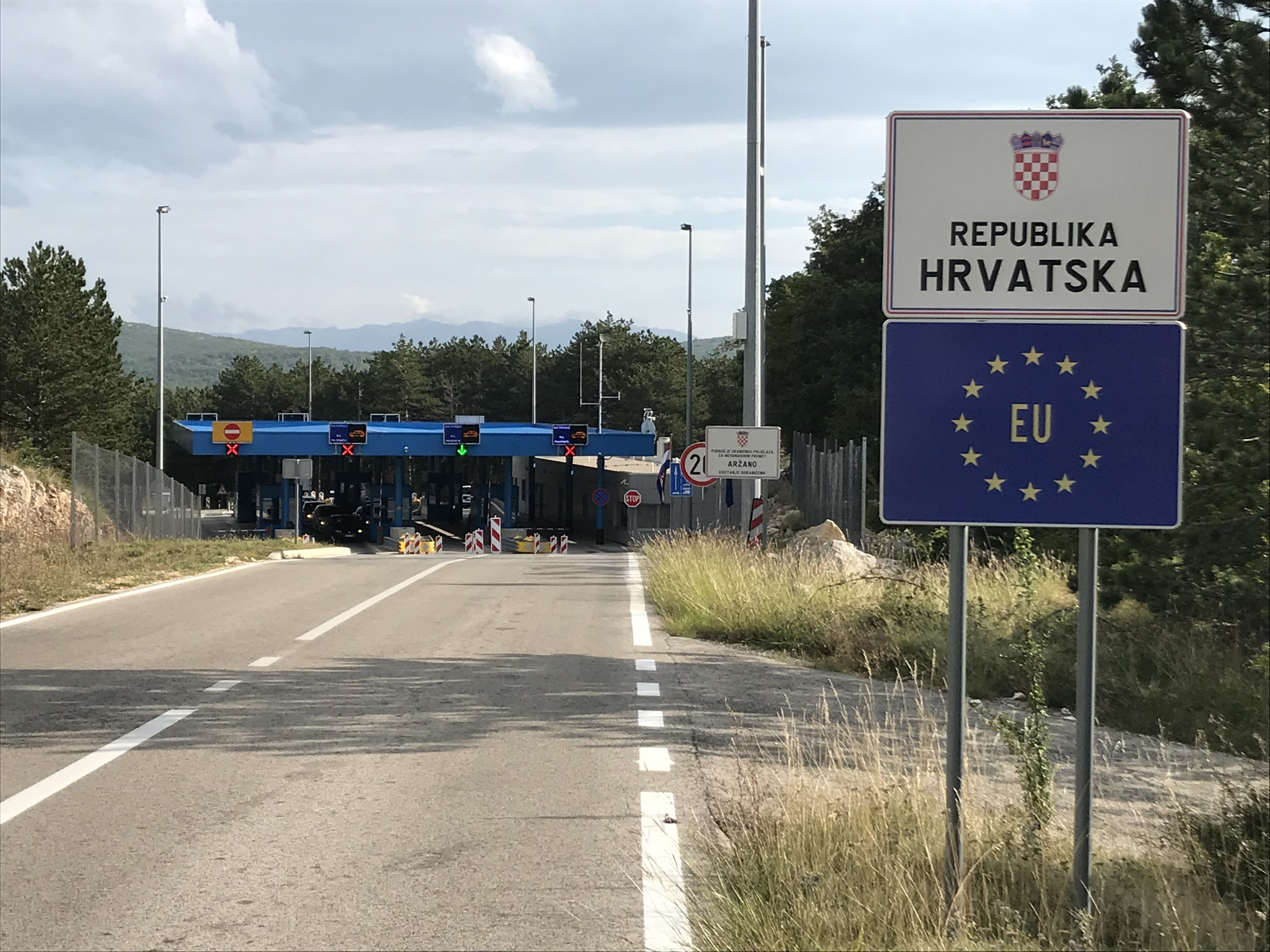
Bosnia and Herzegovina-Croatia border in border crossing Aržano (croatian part)

The border between Bosnia and Herzegovina and Croatia is the longest land border for each of these countries, and is a significant matter in their overall relations. The countries share a 932-kilometer (579 mi) border.

== History ==
Bosnia and Herzegovina and Croatia agreed on a border demarcation treaty in 1999. The treaty was signed by the two former presidents, Alija Izetbegović and Franjo Tuđman, but it was never ratified by the respective parliaments, therefore it never entered into force. Croatia continues to administer areas that the deal assigns to Bosnia and Herzegovina. The agreement foresees a definition of the two countries' territory, in the area of the Pelješac peninsula which is slightly different from what is shown on maps, since Croatia agreed to recognise the sovereignty of Bosnia and Herzegovina over two small rock islands (Mali Školj and Veliki Školj) and the tip of the peninsula of Klek near Neum.

After Croatia became a member of the European Union in the 2013 enlargement, the border forms the external boundary of the European Union. This then became the third longest external land border in the EU.

=== Una river ===
Sections of the Una River and villages at the base of Mount Plješevica are in Croatia, while some are in Bosnia, which means that there would have to be nine border crossings on a single route. Lack of action on this problem impedes any serious development in the region. The Zagreb–Bihać–Split railway line is still closed for major traffic due to this issue.

The border on the Una River between Hrvatska Kostajnica on the northern, Croatian side of the river, and Kostajnica on the southern, Bosnian side, is also being discussed. A river island between the two towns is under Croatian control, but is claimed by Bosnia and Herzegovina. A shared border crossing point has been built and has been functioning since 2003, and is used without hindrance by either party.

=== Neum ===
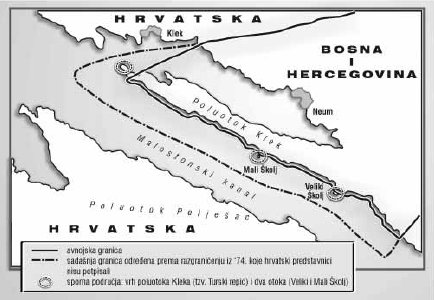
Borders of Bosnia Herzegovina (solid line) near Neum as modified (dashed line) according to the 1999 agreement.

The Herzegovinian municipality of Neum in the south makes the southernmost part of Croatia (Dubrovnik–Neretva County) an exclave. In 1999, a border agreement between former Croatian President Franjo Tuđman and President of Bosnia and Herzegovina Alija Izetbegović moved the Croatia – Bosnia and Herzegovina border near Neum from the very coast (during SFR Yugoslavia era and confirmed by the Badinter Arbitration Committee) further into the sea waters of the Mali Ston Bay, placing two Croatian islands (Mali and Veliki Škoj, incidentally translated into English as Little and Big Island) under Bosnia-Herzegovina sovereignty. Six years later, the Croatian government called for the ratification of this agreement; however, as of 2007, it was not ratified. The two countries negotiated Neum Agreement and Ploče Agreement defining special arrangements for Croatian transit traffic through Neum and Bosnia and Herzegovina access to the port of Ploče to compensate for non-contiguity of Croatian territory between Ploče and Dubrovnik and lack of a seaport in Bosnia and Herzegovina.

=== Pelješac Bridge and access to the high seas ===
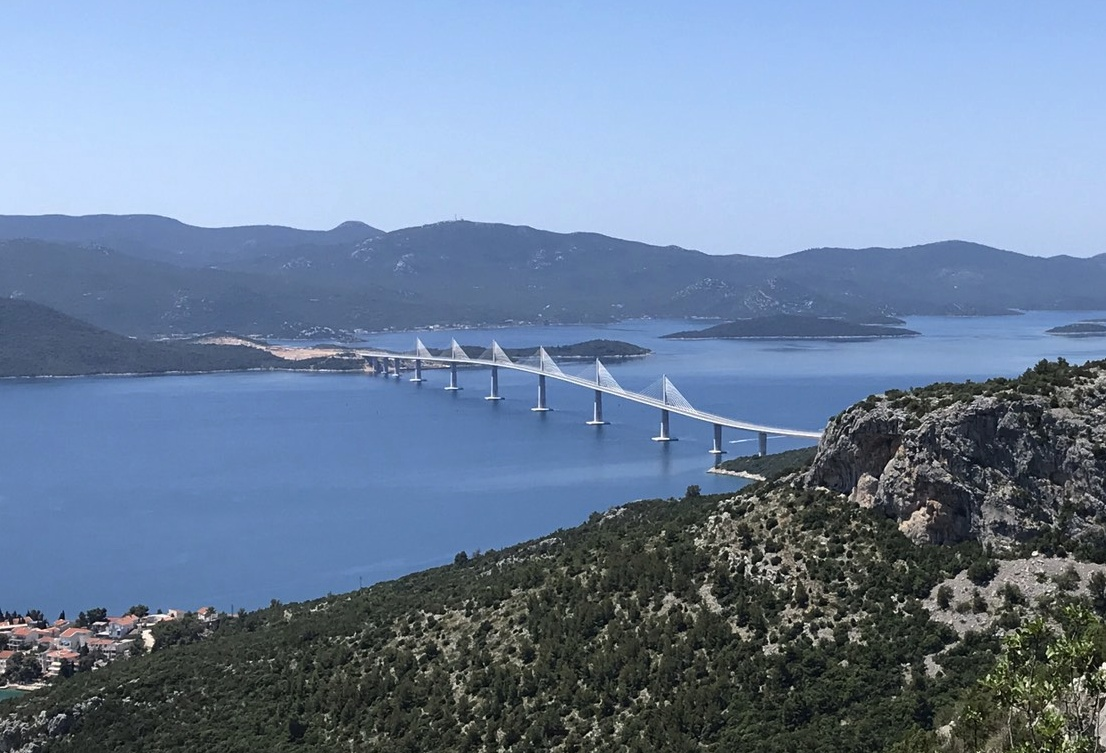
Pelješac Bridge prior to opening, 2022

Croatia has opted to build a bridge to the Pelješac peninsula to connect the Croatian mainland with the exclave as part of the A1 motorway Zagreb–Dubrovnik. On 7 June 2017, the European Commission approved the Croatian Major Project "Road to South Dalmatia" which aims at connecting the southern Dalmatian peninsula of Peljesac with the mainland and thus connect Dubrovnik-Neretva County with the rest of the country. This territory is now separated from the rest of Croatia by around 9 km large corridor of territory of Bosnia and Herzegovina. The project has a total cost of € 526 million with a total eligible cost of € 420 million and an ERDF co-financing of € 357 million.

Croatia claims that the bridge is located exclusively within Croatian territory and Croatian territorial waters and that it is thus entitled under the international law of the sea to construct the bridge without requiring any consent from Bosnia and Herzegovina. Croatia also expressed commitment to fully respect the international rights enjoyed by other countries in the Pelješac peninsula, including the right of innocent passage enjoyed by all countries under the United Nations Convention on the Law of the Sea, and the right of Bosnia and Herzegovina to have unrestricted access to the high seas. Croatia recalled that the foreseen height of the bridge (55 m, 180 ft) will allow the totality of the current Bosnian shipping to use the existing navigational route to transit under the bridge, and that in case any ship taller than 55 meters (180 ft) would need to call on a port in Bosnia and Herzegovina, it could dock instead at the Croatian Ploče port, in line with the 1995 Free Transit agreement.

The construction of the bridge has also been opposed by various political actors in Bosnia and Herzegovina, mostly Bosniak, as they deem it would complicate the country's access to international waters. Bosnian authorities initially opposed the building of the bridge, originally planned to be only 35 meters (115 feet) high, because it would have made it impossible for large ships to enter the harbor of Neum. Although Neum harbor is not currently fit for commercial traffic, and most of the trade to and from Bosnia and Herzegovina goes through the Croatian port of Ploče, the Bosnian government declared that a new one might be built in the future, and that the construction of the bridge would compromise this ambition.

On 17 October 2007, the Presidency of Bosnia and Herzegovina adopted an official position stating that "Bosnia and Herzegovina opposes the construction of the [Pelješac] bridge until the issues related to the determination of the sea borderline between the two countries are resolved" and asking Croatia not to undertake any unilateral actions concerning the construction of the bridge. Bosnian MP Halid Genjac has stated that such official position has never been reverted and is thus still in force, while no official Bosnian body has given its express consent to the construction of the bridge. He argued that "the claims that Croatia is building a bridge on its territory are incorrect because the sea waters beneath the Peljesac bridge are not and cannot be Croatian or internal waters, but international waters stretching from the territorial waters of Bosnia and Herzegovina to the open sea," Genjac argued. The bridge and its access roads opened for traffic on 26 July 2022.

== Road border crossings ==
This is a list of road border crossings that exist as of 2026:

Bosnian name	Bosnian road	Croatian name	Croatian road	Status
Brčko	M-14.1	Gunja		international
Orašje	M-1.8	Županja	|	international
Bosanski Šamac	M-17	Slavonski Šamac		international
Donji Svilaj		Svilaj		international
Bosanski Brod	M-15.1	Slavonski Brod		international
Bosanska Gradiška	M-16	Stara Gradiška		international
Bosanska Gradiška		Gornji Varoš		international
Gradina Donja	M-14	Jasenovac		international
Kozarska Dubica	adjacent to M-14	Hrvatska Dubica	adjacent to	local
Bosanska Kostajnica	adjacent to M-14	Hrvatska Kostajnica	adjacent to	international
Novi Grad	M-4	Dvor		international
Velika Kladuša	R-400a	Maljevac		international
Zagrad	R-401	Pašin Potok	local road	local
Hadžin Potok	local road	Bogovolja	local road	local
Tržačka Raštela	R-403	Kordunski Ljeskovac	local road	international
Izačić	M-5	Ličko Petrovo Selo		international
Ripač	M-11	Užljebić		international
Lička Kaldrma	local road	Kaldrma	local road	local
Strmica	M-14.2	Strmica		international
Uništa	local road	Kijevo	local road	local (no checks)
Vaganj	R-416a	Bili Brig		local
Kamensko	M-16	Kamensko		international
Gornja Prisika	M-16.3	Aržano		international
Vinica	local road	Aržano Pazar	local road	local
Subašići	local road	Dvorine	local road	local
Vir	local road	Cera	local road	local
Čitluk	local road	Jovića most	local road	local
Osoje	M-15	Gornji Vinjani		international
Gorica	M-6	Donji Vinjani		international
Drinovci	local road	Runović	local road	local
Drinovačko Brdo	local road	Slivno	local road	local
Orahovlje	R-422	Orah	local road	international
Prolog	M-16.3	Podprolog	local road	local
Crveni Grm	R-424	Mali Prolog		international
Bijača		Nova Sela		international
Zvirići	R-423	Prud	Road 6218	international
Gabela	R-425a	Gabela Polje 1	local road	local
Gabela	local road	Gabela Polje 2	local road	local
Doljani	M-17	Metković		international
Radež	local road	Vukov Klanac	local road	local
Neum 1	M-2	Klek		international
Neum 2	M-2	Zaton Doli	(old)	international
Duži	M-17.3	Imotica	local road	local
Trebinja	local road	Čepikuće		local
Orahov Do	R-428	Slano	Road 6232	local
Ivanica	M-20	Gornji Brgat		international
