= Ambassadors of Croatia =

Diplomatic position of Croatia

Ambassadors of Croatia, also referred to as heads of diplomatic missions, are persons who conduct the foreign policy of the Republic of Croatia in the state or international organization they are appointed to. They also monitor and coordinate the work of consular offices in the receiving state, and take measures to align their activities in matters concerning the development of mutual relations with the receiving state. Ambassadors directly manage diplomatic missions, organize the work of the mission, and take measures to carry out the tasks within the mission's scope of work based on the instructions of the minister and state secretaries among other duties. Ambassadors are accountable to the President of the Republic of Croatia and to the Minister of Foreign and European Affairs.

According to article 99 of the Constitution of Croatia, ambassadors are nominated by the Government of Croatia which is subject to the non-binding opinion of the relevant committee of the Croatian Parliament. The ambassador is confirmed with the signature of both the Prime Minister of Croatia and the President.

== Current Croatian ambassadors ==
Host country	List	Ambassador	Concurrent accreditation	Embassy	Website
Albania	List	Zlatko Kramarić		Tirana	Homepage
Algeria	List	Ilija Želalić	Countries: Mali	Algiers	Homepage
Argentina	List	Duška Paravić	Countries: Paraguay; Uruguay	Buenos Aires	Homepage
Australia	List	Betty Bernardica Pavelich	Countries: Fiji; Kiribati; Nauru; New Zealand; Papua New Guinea; Samoa; Solomon Islands; Tuvalu; Vanuatu; Consular jurisdiction only: Tonga (Note: Tonga is listed only under the consular jurisdiction of the Croatian Embassy in Canberra. As of 2026, the two countries have yet to establish formal diplomatic relations.)	Canberra	Homepage
Austria	List	Daniel Glunčić		Vienna	Homepage
Azerbaijan	List	Branko Zebić	Countries: Georgia	Baku	Homepage
Belgium	List	Josip Paro	Countries: Luxembourg	Brussels	Homepage
Bosnia and Herzegovina	List	Ivan Sabolić		Sarajevo	Homepage
Brazil	List	Ranko Vilović	Countries: Colombia; Trinidad and Tobago; Venezuela	Brasília	Homepage
Bulgaria	List	Jasna Ognjanovac		Sofia	Homepage
Canada	List	Vice Skračić		Ottawa	Homepage
Chile	List	Mira Martinec	Countries: Bolivia; Ecuador; Peru	Santiago	Homepage
China	List	Dario Mihelin	Countries: Mongolia; North Korea	Beijing	Homepage
Czech Republic	List	Ljiljana Pancirov		Prague	Homepage
Denmark	List	Tina Krce	Countries: Iceland	Copenhagen	Homepage
Egypt	List	Tomislav Bošnjak	Countries: Eritrea; Djibouti; Ethiopia; Jordan; Lebanon; Libya; Palestine; Saudi Arabia; Somalia; South Sudan; Sudan; Syria; United Arab Emirates; Yemen	Cairo	Homepage
Finland	List	Josip Buljević	Countries: Estonia	Helsinki	Homepage
France	List	Vacant since January 16, 2021; Senka Burić, Chargé d'Affaires a.i.	Countries: Benin; Central African Republic; Republic of the Congo; DRC; Chad; Equatorial Guinea; Guinea; Monaco; Niger; Togo	Paris	Homepage
Germany	List	Gordan Bakota		Berlin	Homepage
Greece	List	Aleksandar Sunko	Countries: Armenia; Cyprus	Athens	Homepage
Holy See (Note: The Croatian Embassy to the Holy See is located outside Vatican territory in Rome.)	List	Vacant since March 31, 2021; Tea Zupičić, Chargé d'Affaires a.i.	Countries: Sovereign Military Order of Malta	Palazzo Rusticucci-Accoramboni	Homepage
Hungary	List	Mladen Andrlić		Budapest	Homepage
India	List	Petar Ljubičić	Countries: Bangladesh; Bhutan; Maldives; Nepal; Sri Lanka	New Delhi	Homepage
Indonesia	List	Nebojša Koharović	Countries: East Timor; Philippines; Singapore; Thailand; International Organizations: Association of Southeast Asian Nations (Note: Accredited as an observer mission.)	Jakarta	Homepage
Iran	List	Drago Štambuk, not present in embassy since February 28, 2026; Sanja Matijević, Chargé d'Affaires a.i.	Countries: Pakistan	Tehran	Homepage
Iraq	List	Ivan Jurić		Baghdad	Homepage
Ireland	List	Davor Vidiš		Dublin	Homepage
Israel	List	Vesela Mrđen Korać		Tel Aviv	Homepage
Italy	List	Jasen Mesić	Countries: Malta; San Marino; International Organizations: Food and Agriculture Organization; International Fund for Agricultural Development; World Food Programme	Rome	Homepage
Japan	List	Dražen Hrastić		Tokyo	Homepage
Kazakhstan	List	Refik Šabanović	Countries: Kyrgyzstan; Tajikistan; Uzbekistan	Astana	Homepage
Kosovo	List	Danijela Barišić		Pristina	Homepage
Kuwait	List	Amir Muharemi	Countries: Bahrain	Kuwait City	Homepage
Lithuania	List	Vacant since December 7, 2020; Ivan Jerzečić, Chargé d'Affaires a.i.		Vilnius	Homepage
Malaysia	List	Ivan Velimir Starčević	Countries: Brunei; Cambodia; Laos; Myanmar; Vietnam	Kuala Lumpur	Homepage
Montenegro	List	Veselko Grubišić		Podgorica	Homepage
Morocco	List	Jasna Mileta	Countries: Burkina Faso; Cameroon; Gabon; Ivory Coast; Mauritania; Senegal; Tunisia	Rabat	Homepage
Netherlands	List	Dubravka Plejić Marković	International Organizations: OPCW	The Hague	Homepage
North Macedonia	List	Nives Tiganj		Skopje	Homepage
Norway	List	Andrea Gustović-Ercegovac		Oslo	Homepage
Poland	List	Tomislav Vidošević		Warsaw	Homepage
Portugal	List	Anita Tršić	Countries: Angola; Cape Verde; Guinea-Bissau; São Tomé and Príncipe	Lisbon	Homepage
Qatar	List	Drago Lovrić	Countries: Oman	Doha	Homepage
Romania	List	Marija Kapitanović	Countries: Moldova	Bucharest	Homepage
Russia	List	Tomislav Car	Countries: Belarus	Moscow	Homepage
Serbia	List	Hidajet Biščević		Belgrade	Homepage
Slovakia	List	Aleksandar Heina		Bratislava	Homepage
Slovenia	List	Boris Grigić		Ljubljana	Homepage
South Africa	List	Ante Cicvarić	Countries: Botswana; Burundi; Comoros; Eswatini; Kenya; Lesotho; Madagascar; Malawi; Mauritius; Mozambique; Namibia; Rwanda; Seychelles; Tanzania; Uganda; Zambia; Zimbabwe	Pretoria	Homepage
South Korea	List	Damir Kušen		Seoul	Homepage
Spain	List	Nives Malenica	Countries: Andorra; Cuba	Madrid	Homepage
Sweden	List	Siniša Grgić	Countries: Latvia	Stockholm	Homepage
Switzerland	List	Andrea Bekić	Countries: Liechtenstein	Bern	Homepage
Turkey	List	Hrvoje Cvitanović	Countries: Afghanistan; Turkmenistan	Ankara	Homepage
Ukraine	List	Anica Djamić		Kiev	Homepage
United Kingdom	List	Vacant since May 31, 2023; Davor Ljubanović, Chargé d'Affaires a.i.	Countries: Gambia; Ghana; Liberia; Nigeria; Sierra Leone	London	Homepage
United States	List	Pjer Šimunović	Countries: Marshall Islands; Mexico; Micronesia; Palau; Panama; International Organizations: Organization of American States	Washington, D.C.	Homepage

== Croatian ambassadors to international organizations ==
Host organization	List	Ambassador	Concurrent accreditation	Embassy	Website
Council of Europe	List	Toma Galli		Strasbourg	Homepage
European Union	List	Irena Andrassy		Brussels	Homepage
NATO	List	Vacant since July 3, 2025; Mirko Ujdenica, Chargé d'Affaires a.i.		Brussels	Homepage
UN	List	Vacant since February 28, 2025; Hrvoje Ćurić-Hrvatinić, Deputy Head of Mission	Countries: Antigua and Barbuda; Bahamas; Barbados; Belize; Costa Rica; Dominica; Dominican Republic; El Salvador; Grenada; Guyana; Guatemala; Haiti; Honduras; Jamaica; Nicaragua; Saint Kitts and Nevis; Saint Lucia; Saint Vincent and the Grenadines; Suriname	New York City	Homepage
UN	List	Mario Horvatić	International Organizations: OSCE; IAEA; UNIDO	Vienna	Homepage
UN	List	Vacant since August 31, 2022; Andrea Javor, Chargé d'Affaires a.i.	International Organizations: World Trade Organization	Geneva	Homepage

== See also ==
- List of diplomatic missions of Croatia
