= Bosnia and Herzegovina–Croatia relations =

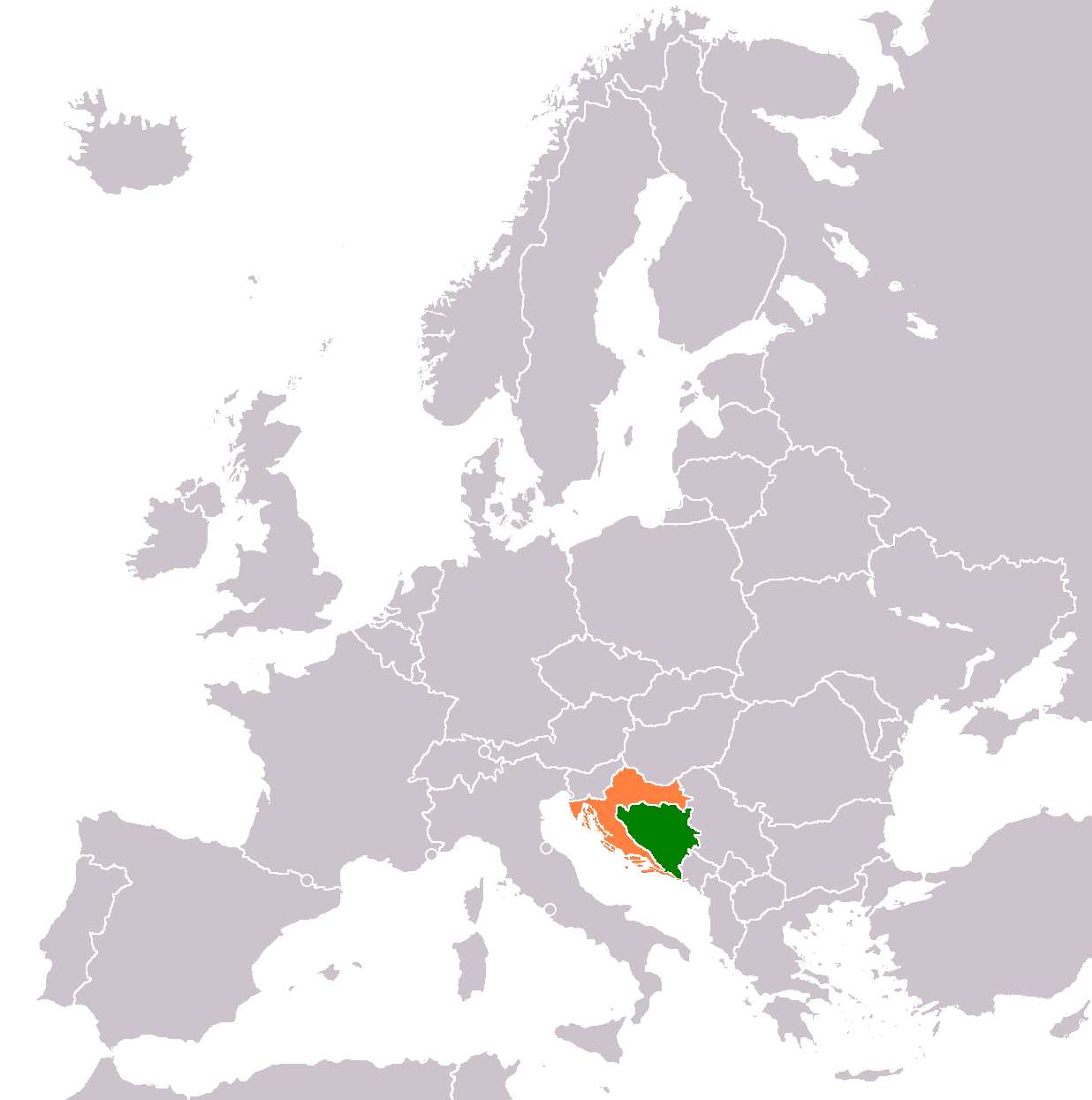

- Bosnia and Herzegovina: Croatia

Diplomatic mission
- Embassy of Bosnia and Herzegovina, Zagreb: Embassy of Croatia, Sarajevo

The foreign relations between Bosnia and Herzegovina (BiH) and Croatia are bound together by shared history, language, neighboring geography and cultural commonalties. They established diplomatic relations in 1992, following the dissolution of Yugoslavia and independence of Croatia. The Washington Agreement (1994) and Dayton Accords (1995) continue to guide bilateral foreign affairs. The two countries share a 932-kilometer (579 mi) border – the third longest external land border in the European Union (EU). Modern relations between the two states are generally functional, marked by regular cooperation, while some political issues remain unresolved.

Their roles in the Bosnian War and the Croat–Bosniak War of the 1990s continue to complicate modern relations. Disputes remain over their shared border, extradition treaties, as well as sovereign ownership of infrastructure and nuclear assets. The complex ethnic makeup of Bosnia and Herzegovina has led to Croatia's financing of their "two schools under one roof" system. Their common geography has complicated immigration. Croatia agreed to yield the Neum Corridor – 20 kilometres (12 mi) of their 6,400-kilometre coast – to Bosnia in 1991, giving the Bosnian state the second-shortest coastline in the world. Croats of Bosnia and Herzegovina (544,780 persons) comprised 15.43% of the country's population in 2013.

Croatian is also one of the official languages of Bosnia and Herzegovina, together with Bosnian and Serbian, both of which are also recognized as minority languages of Croatia; the three are fully mutually intelligible standard varieties of Serbo-Croatian. Both countries have similar population sizes and collaborate extensively on economic treaties that mutually benefit their growth. Croatia is a member of the European Union (EU) and Eurozone, while BiH is a candidate for EU accession; both are in the Council of Europe. BiH has an embassy in Zagreb with Croatia maintaining an embassy in Sarajevo and six consulates in Sarajevo, Banja Luka, Mostar, Tuzla, Livno and Vitez.

== Demographics ==
The Croats of Bosnia and Herzegovina (544,780 persons at the 2013 census) comprise 15.43% of the country's population and 22.4% of the Federation entity, where 91% of them live. Four out of ten Federation's cantons have a Croat majority. According to the Croatian 2021 census, there were 109,352 people with both Croatian and another citizenship, the majority of whom were Croats of Bosnia and Herzegovina living in Croatia. Bosniaks of Croatia amounted to 24,131 at the 2021 census (0.6%). There is also a smaller number of Serbs of Bosnia and Herzegovina working in Croatia.

Bosnia and Herzegovina and Croatia have signed an Agreement on Dual Citizenship in 2007 and ratified it in 2011, which is when it entered into full force, but even before the signing of the agreement many citizen of Bosnia and Herzegovina were given Croatian citizenship based on provisions in the Croatian Citizenship Act which explicitly allows members of the Croatian people living outside Croatia to acquire citizenship without renouncing their existing citizenship. According to the Croatian Ministry of Interior, 384,631 Croatian citizens had registered residence in Bosnia and Herzegovina in July 2019. 35,547 citizens of Croatia cast their vote at polling stations in Bosnia and Herzegovina for the 2019–20 Croatian presidential election, and 21,898 for the parliamentary elections in July 2020.

Several high-level Croatian politicians have been born in Bosnia and Herzegovina, including:

- Zagreb's mayor Milan Bandić, from Grude;
- Minister of Defence Gojko Šušak, from Široki Brijeg;
- Minister of Defence Jozo Radoš, from Seonica;
- Minister of Foreign Affairs Marija Pejčinović Burić, from Mostar;
- Minister of Foreign Affairs Gordan Grlić-Radman, from Prisoje;
- Minister of Finance Ivan Šuker, from Livno;
- Minister of Economy Ljubo Jurčić, from Ružići;
- Minister of Economy Davor Filipović, from Sarajevo;
- Minister of Health and Minister of Veterans' Affairs Juraj Njavro, from Neum;
- Minister of Science, Education and Sports Dragan Primorac, from Banja Luka;
- Members of Parliament Nino Raspudić (from Mostar), Nevenko Barbarić (from Klobuk), Daniel Spajić (from Žepče), Ljubica Maksimčuk (from Teslić), Radoje Vidović (from Fojnica), Pero Ćosić (from Široki Brijeg);

Some of them have been active politically in both countries, including:

- Božo Ljubić, from Uzarići, BiH Minister of Communication (2007–2009), member of Parliament of Croatia
- Željana Zovko, from Mostar, ambassador of Bosnia and Herzegovina and later Member of the European Parliament from Croatia

Bosnia and Herzegovina's Foreign Affairs Minister Bisera Turković was born in Sisak, Croatia.

== Diplomatic relations ==
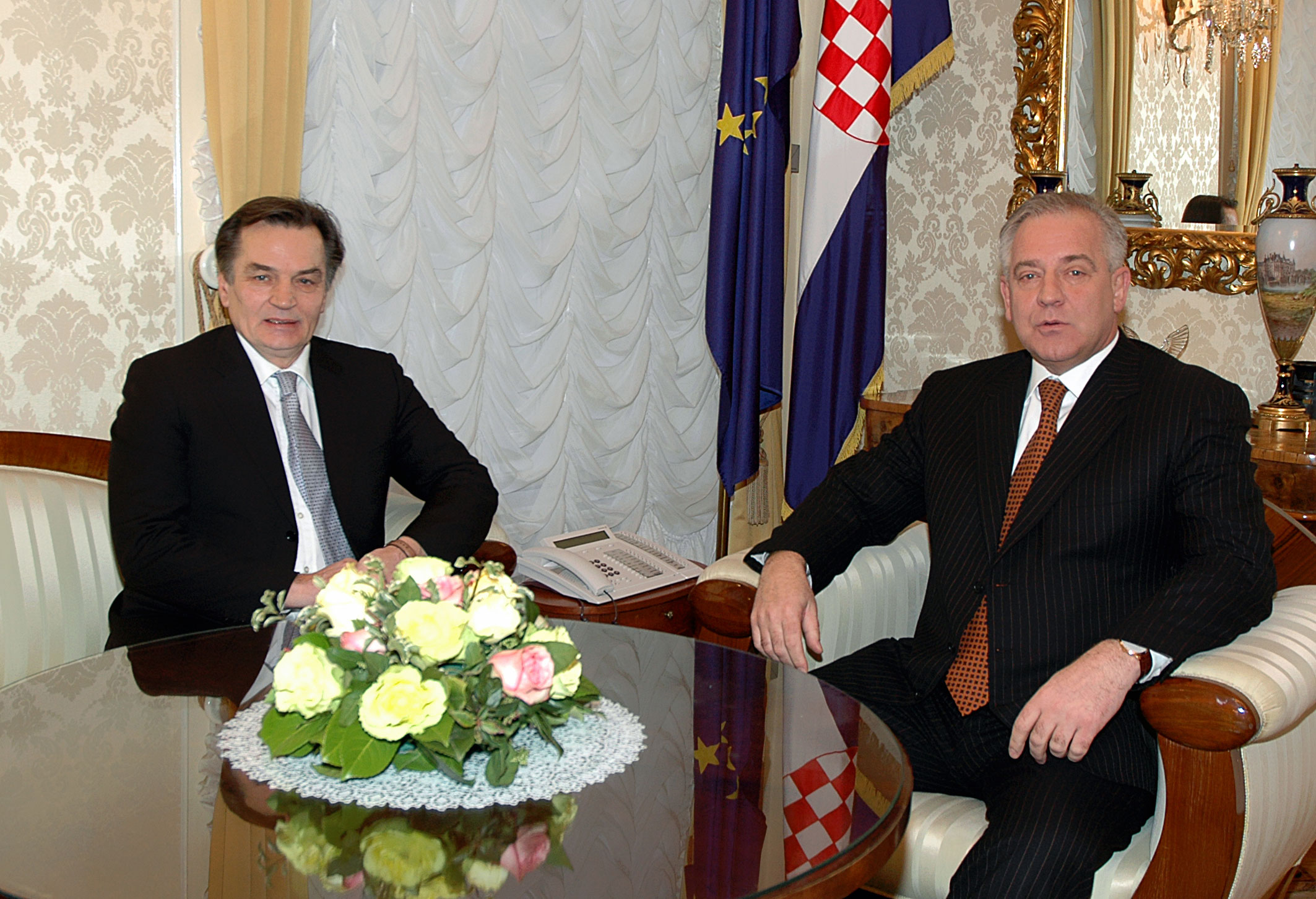
Bosnian Presidency member Haris Silajdžić (left) and former Croatian Prime Minister Ivo Sanader (right) in 2010.

Bosnia and Herzegovina's and Croatia's diplomatic relations started with Croatia recognizing Bosnia and Herzegovina on 24 January 1992, which Bosnia and Herzegovina reciprocated on 7 April the same year, and both countries finally signed an agreement of mutual friendship and co-operation on 21 July the same year, during the series of Yugoslav Wars. Together, Bosnia and Herzegovina and Croatia have signed 111 various treaties delimiting issues ranging from establishment of diplomatic missions to resolving border disputes.

The Croatian embassy in Bosnia and Herzegovina is located in Sarajevo and its 6 consulates are located in Sarajevo (consulate-general), Banja Luka, Mostar, Livno, Vitez and Tuzla. The current Croatian ambassador in BiH is Ivan Sabolić. Current BiH ambassador in Croatia is Azra Kalajdžisalihović.

Bosnia and Herzegovina has its embassy in Zagreb. Beside the embassy, there is one consulate-general of Bosnia and Herzegovina in Croatia, also located in Zagreb.

== Croatia's role in the Bosnian War ==
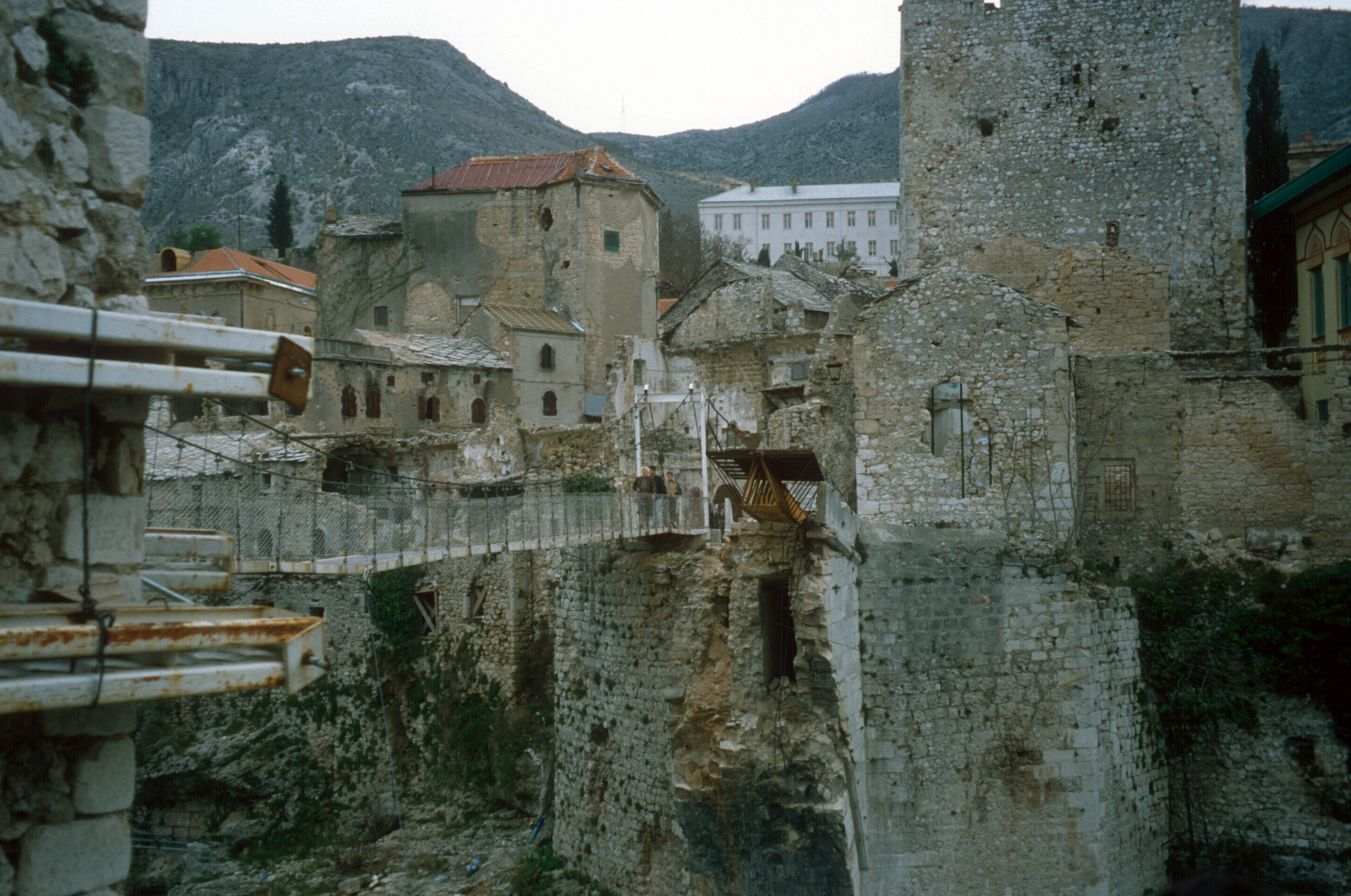
The temporary cable bridge following the destruction of Mostar's Old Bridge in November 1993.

Both Bosnia and Herzegovina and Croatia were engaged in the early-1990s Yugoslav wars. From July 1991 to January 1992, during the Croatian War of Independence, the Yugoslav People's Army (JNA) and Serb paramilitaries used Bosnian territory to wage attacks on Croatia. In parallel to its own war of independence, Croatia was involved in the armed conflict on Bosnia and Herzegovina's territory. At first, Bosniaks and Croats fought in an alliance against the Yugoslav People's Army (JNA) and the Army of Republika Srpska (VRS). By September 1992, Croatia had accepted 335,985 refugees from Bosnia and Herzegovina, mostly Bosniak civilians (excluding men of military age). By the end of 1992, however, tensions in Central Bosnia increased, leading to open conflict by early 1993, when Croats established the Croatian Republic of Herzeg-Bosnia.

The Croat–Bosniak War opposed from 18 October 1992 to 23 February 1994 the Republic of Bosnia and Herzegovina and the self-proclaimed Croatian Republic of Herzeg-Bosnia, supported by Croatia. Most of the fighting took place in Central Bosnia and in the Herzegovina region between the Army of the Republic of Bosnia and Herzegovina (ARBiH), and the Croatian Defence Council (HVO). ARBiH expelled slightly over 150,000 Croats, while the HVO expelled around 50,000 Bosniaks. The most symbolic episode of the conflict was the destruction of Mostar's Old Bridge by the Croat militia's bombing on 9 November 1993. On 23 February 1994, a ceasefire was reached, and the Washington Agreement was signed on 18 March 1994 leading to the establishment of the Federation of Bosnia and Herzegovina and joint operations against the Serb forces, which helped alter the military balance and bring the Bosnian War to an end. Split Agreement called on the Croatian Army (HV) to intervene militarily in Bosnia and Herzegovina, primarily in relieving the siege of Bihać.

Croatia was a signatory of the Dayton Peace Agreement, on behalf of itself and of the Croat militias in BiH, thus assuming international obligations. This role is often misrepresented in Croatia as the one of "guarantor" of the agreement.

The International Criminal Tribunal for the former Yugoslavia (ICTY) convicted 17 HVO and Herzeg-Bosnia officials, six of whom were convicted for participating in a joint criminal enterprise that sought to annex or control Croat-majority parts of Bosnia and Herzegovina, and two ARBiH officials for war crimes committed during the conflict. The ICTY ruled that Croatia had overall control over the HVO and that the conflict was international in character.

According to the CIA World Factbook, 7,269 Croatian refugees still live in Bosnia and Herzegovina and the country has 131,600 internally displaced persons.

== Yugoslav succession issues ==
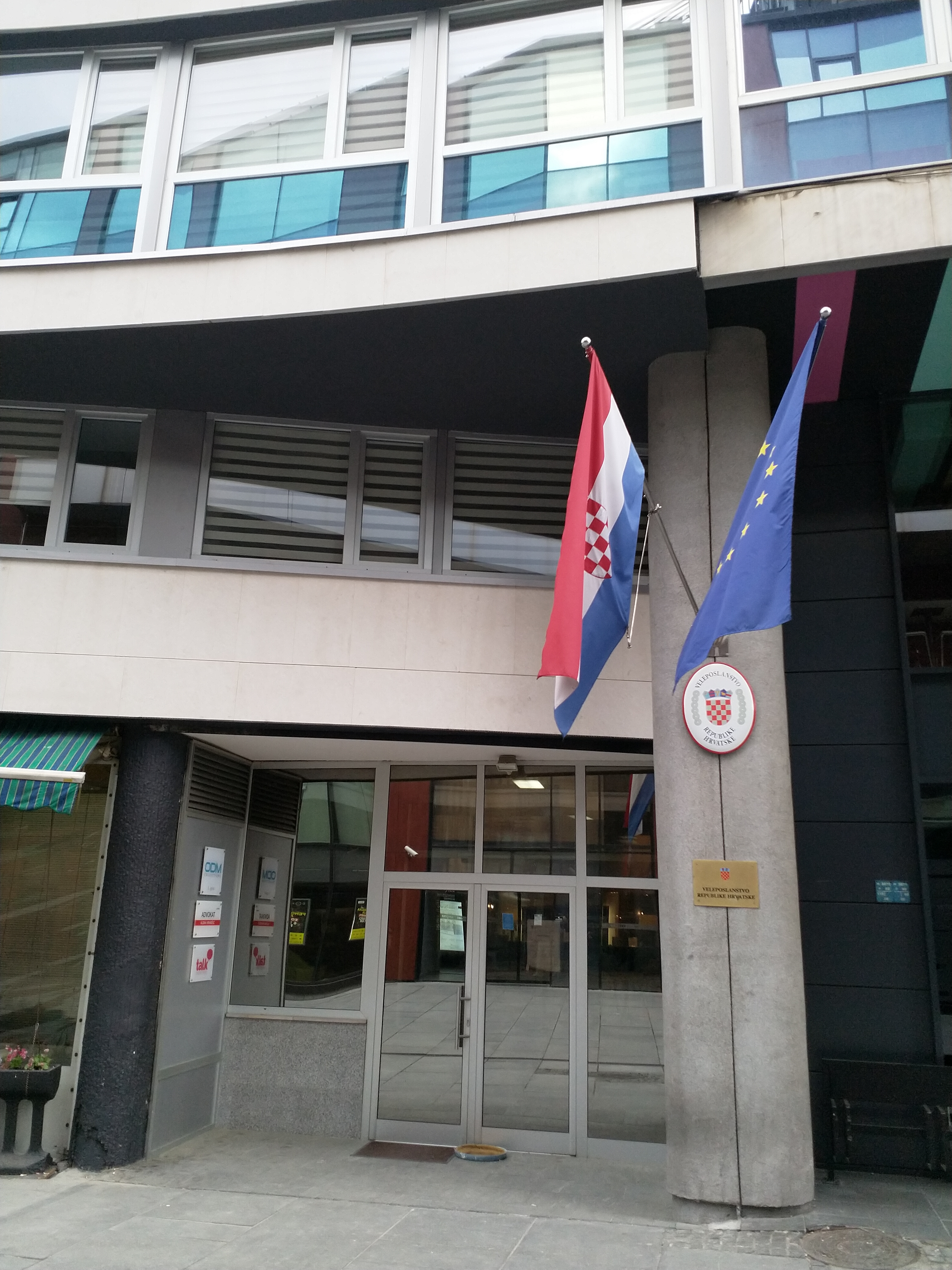
Embassy of Croatia in Sarajevo, 2020

=== Property restitution ===
The 2001 agreement on Yugoslavia's succession issues foresaw a follow-up bilateral agreement on the restitution of specific properties of Bosnia and Herzegovina on the territory of Croatia, which include petrol stations, hotels (such as the Hidrogradnja complex in Baška Voda), and assets at the ports of Šibenik and Ploče, for a total worth estimated at 10 billion euros. 64 such assets have been registered by the Republika Srpska entity, and 78 by the Federation entity; there is no State-level single registry. Negotiations for a bilateral agreement lasted until 2012, when they were discontinued due to Croatia's unwillingness to agree with Republika Srpska's request for a right to perpetual ownership of the properties. In 2018, Croatia adopted a law on state property management, allowing the rental of such properties with concessions for up to 30 years. This raised concerns in Bosnia and Herzegovina.

=== Extradition ===
In May 2009, Bosnia and Herzegovina and Croatia contested the execution of a treaty of mutual extradition of the countries' citizens, owing to many convicted people fleeing to the other country and attaining dual citizenship to be virtually immune to extradition. These people have included Ognjen Šimić, a surgeon from Rijeka convicted to nine years in prison for accepting bribes; Ante Jelavić, a former president of the Presidency of Bosnia and Herzegovina convicted in Croatia to 9.5 years for alleged abuse of position at the Bank of Herzegovina in Mostar; and others. According to Bosnia and Herzegovina government, fourteen people sentenced in Bosnia and Herzegovina live self-exiled as Croatian citizens. The two countries secured an agreement that would allow imprisoning such escapees for their sentences within their current country of residence without their consent (the status quo version requires consent of the escapee, which is usually not given).

=== Border issues ===
The two countries have several small disputed sections of the boundary, the most prominent of which is the one related to maritime access.

== Bilateral issues ==
=== Political relations and status of the Croat people in Bosnia and Herzegovina ===
Debate over the political representation of Bosnian Croats has been a recurring issue in Bosnia and Herzegovina–Croatia relations. Under Bosnia and Herzegovina's electoral system, voters in the Federation of Bosnia and Herzegovina elect the Bosniak and Croat members of the tripartite Presidency, and voters may choose which of the two contests to vote in. Bosnian Croat parties and Croatian officials have argued that this framework enables the Croat member of the Presidency to be elected with decisive support from non-Croat voters, while other actors have defended the system as consistent with the existing legal framework.

Following the October 2018 general election, Croatia criticised the election of Željko Komšić as the Croat member of the Presidency, arguing that he lacked support among the main Croat parties and was elected largely with votes from predominantly Bosniak areas. In December 2018, the Croatian Parliament adopted a declaration calling for constitutional and electoral changes in Bosnia and Herzegovina aimed at improving the political position of Croats.

This resolution was deemed by the Office of the High Representative as in violation of Croatia's obligations of non-interference under the Dayton Agreement. Bishop Franjo Komarica of Banja Luka claimed that Catholics are being discriminated in all respects: politically, socially, and economically, mentioning that Catholics often have problems when they have Croat names.

Croatia has continued to advocate electoral and constitutional reforms in Bosnia and Herzegovina that, in its stated view, would prevent the outvoting of Croat preferences in the Federation and strengthen Croat representation in state-level and entity institutions, and has raised the issue in European Union discussions related to Bosnia and Herzegovina's accession process.

Electoral reform has also been addressed through interventions by the Office of the High Representative (OHR), an issue that Croatia has closely followed in connection with the political position of Bosnian Croats. On 2 October 2022, High Representative Christian Schmidt imposed amendments to the Constitution of the Federation of Bosnia and Herzegovina and to the election law, stating that the changes were intended to reduce post-election institutional deadlock and facilitate the formation of the Federation government. The amendments included changes to the composition and selection rules of the Federation House of Peoples, which plays a central role in government formation in the Federation. Croatian officials welcomed the decision, describing it as supportive of equality and representation for Croats in Bosnia and Herzegovina and as consistent with Croatia's long-standing advocacy on the issue.

In March 2024, Schmidt imposed further amendments described as an "integrity package", aimed at strengthening election administration and reducing irregularities, including through new technical and procedural safeguards. Reuters reported that Croat political leaders continued to demand additional reforms related to the rules for electing the Croat member of the Presidency, indicating that the dispute remained a recurring issue in Bosnia and Herzegovina–Croatia relations despite integrity-focused changes to the electoral framework.

In July 2026, the Croatian Parliament adopted the Resolution on strengthening the political position of Croats in Bosnia and Herzegovina which supported establishing a Croatian electoral unit for the election of the Croatian member of the Presidency of Bosnia and Herzegovina.

=== Two schools under one roof ===
Croatia is a sponsor of Bosnia and Herzegovina's segregated school system, exemplified by the "two schools under one roof". Children from two ethnic groups, Bosniaks and Croats, attend classes in the same building, but physically separated from each other and taught separate curricula. Children from one ethnic group often enter the school through one door, while children from other ethnic group through another. In the Federation entity of BiH, 57 schools operated in this way in the year 2010. By 2018, 56 such schools remained. This phenomenon of ethnic separation is attributed to the Croat–Bosniak War (1992–1994) and the creation of Herzeg-Bosnia on the territory of Bosnia and Herzegovina. Croatia continues to finance the system of separate Croatian-curriculum public schools in BiH.

=== Migration management ===
Since 2018, increased migratory flows has posed challenges at the border between Croatia and Bosnia and Herzegovina, in particular along the region of Una-Sana Canton. Since January 2018, around 32,000 migrants have entered BiH, out of them around 7,200 are estimated be in BiH currently. Civil society and international organisations has reported violent collective expulsion (pushbacks) of migrants and asylum seekers back into Bosnia and Herzegovina. Croatian authorities have rejected these accusations. The Croatian Ombudsman has, however, raised serious concerns on the activities of Croatian police at the border with BiH.

Croatia and Bosnia and Herzegovina are parties to a bilateral readmission agreement regulating the handover and acceptance of persons whose entry or stay is illegal. In 2024, Bosnia and Herzegovina accepted 3,255 migrants returned from Croatia under the bilateral readmission agreement (2,458 in 2023).

=== Nuclear waste disposal site in Trgovska Gora ===
Bosnia and Herzegovina has objected to Croatia's plans to establish a radioactive waste disposal facility at Trgovska Gora, near the town of Dvor and close to the Bosnian border. The proposed site, located at the former Čerkezovac military barracks, is intended for the storage of low- and intermediate-level radioactive waste, including waste associated with Croatia's share from the Krško Nuclear Power Plant in Slovenia.

Authorities in Bosnia and Herzegovina have raised concerns regarding potential cross-border environmental impacts, citing the site's proximity to the Una River basin, groundwater systems, and seismically sensitive areas. Officials at both state and entity levels have argued that the project could pose risks to public health and protected natural areas in northwestern Bosnia and Herzegovina.

The dispute has periodically affected bilateral relations, with Bosnia and Herzegovina indicating that it could pursue international legal remedies if the project proceeds without sufficient consultation or agreement. Croatia has rejected these concerns, maintaining that the Trgovska Gora facility complies with European Union safety standards and is based on environmental impact assessments conducted in accordance with EU law.

On the 15th of December 2025, the Croatian Parliament adopted legislation regulating the construction and operation of the radioactive waste management centre, reaffirming the government's intention to proceed with the project despite continued opposition from Bosnia and Herzegovina.

=== Pollution from the Brod fuel refinery ===
The Croatian government has raised concerns about the cross-border impact of pollution from the fuel refinery in Brod (BiH), owned by Russian state-owned company Zarubezhneft. After an explosion incident on 9 October 2018 that left one person dead and ten injured, the refinery ceased operations. The company has not announced its shutdown, but the refinery remains closed down as of 2022.

== Economic development and cooperation ==
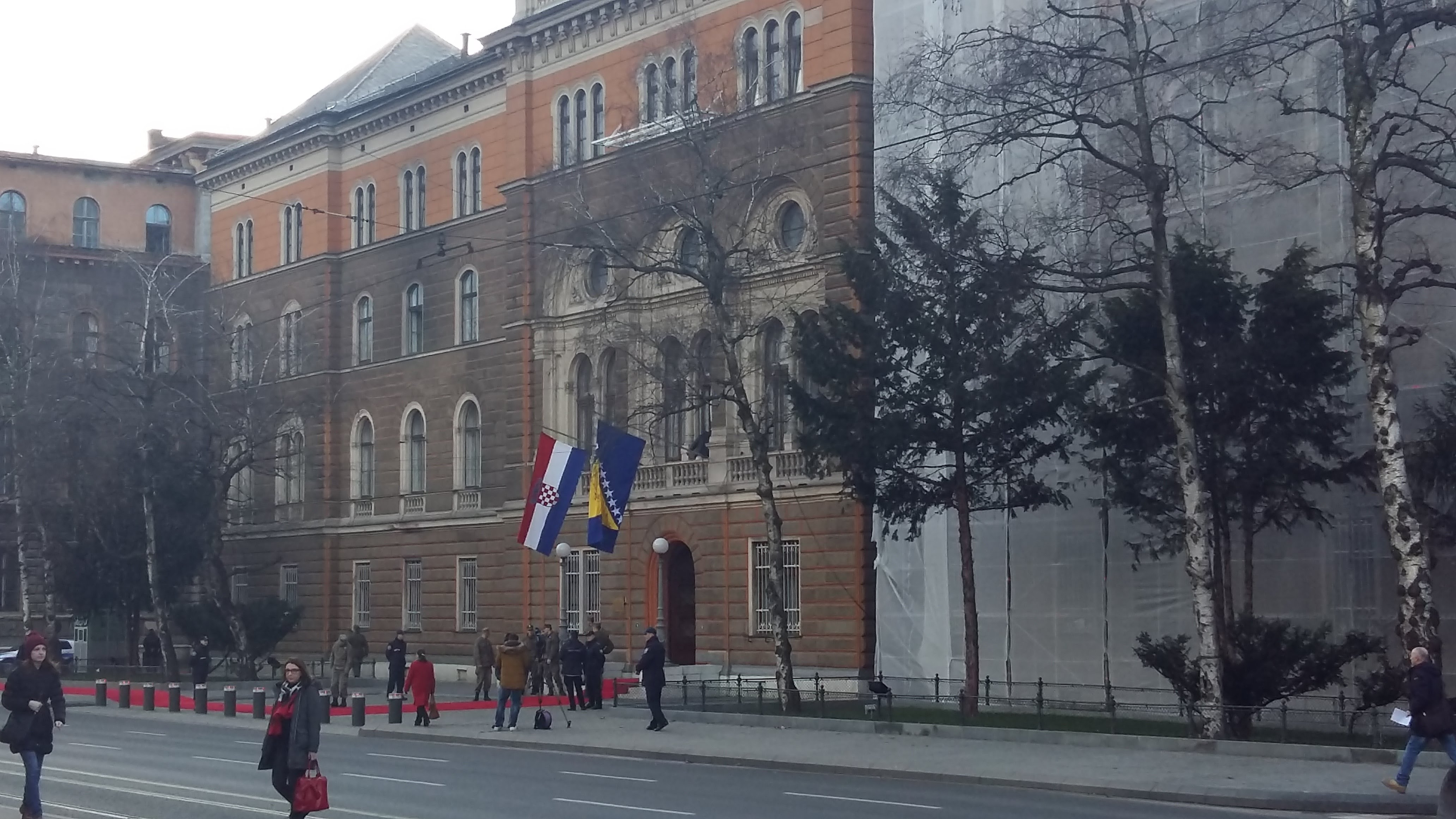
Building of the Presidency of Bosnia and Herzegovina during a visit of the president of Croatia, Kolinda Grabar-Kitarović in 2018.

=== Infrastructure and connectivity ===
As Bosnia and Herzegovina and Croatia each share the largest part of their border with the other (932 km (579 mi)), they have participated in numerous joint ventures aimed at improving cross-border transport and trade. One of the most prominent projects is the widening of Pan-European Corridor Vc (E73) to freeway standards. Although extending to the Adriatic Sea from Budapest in Hungary, Corridor Vc (in Bosnia and Herzegovina designated as A1) has been treated as a strategic national connectivity project in Bosnia and Herzegovina, including as its longest motorway corridor (about 340 km (210 mi)). It passes through Croatia in two stretches: one in eastern Slavonia near Osijek and Đakovo (A5) and the other at the coast near Ploče and Metković (A10).

Croatia and Bosnia and Herzegovina have coordinated Corridor Vc-related works through bilateral agreements, including for a cross-border bridge over the Sava River near Svilaj. The Svilaj bridge opened to traffic in 2021 and was presented by EU institutions as a regional connectivity project co-financed by the European Union.

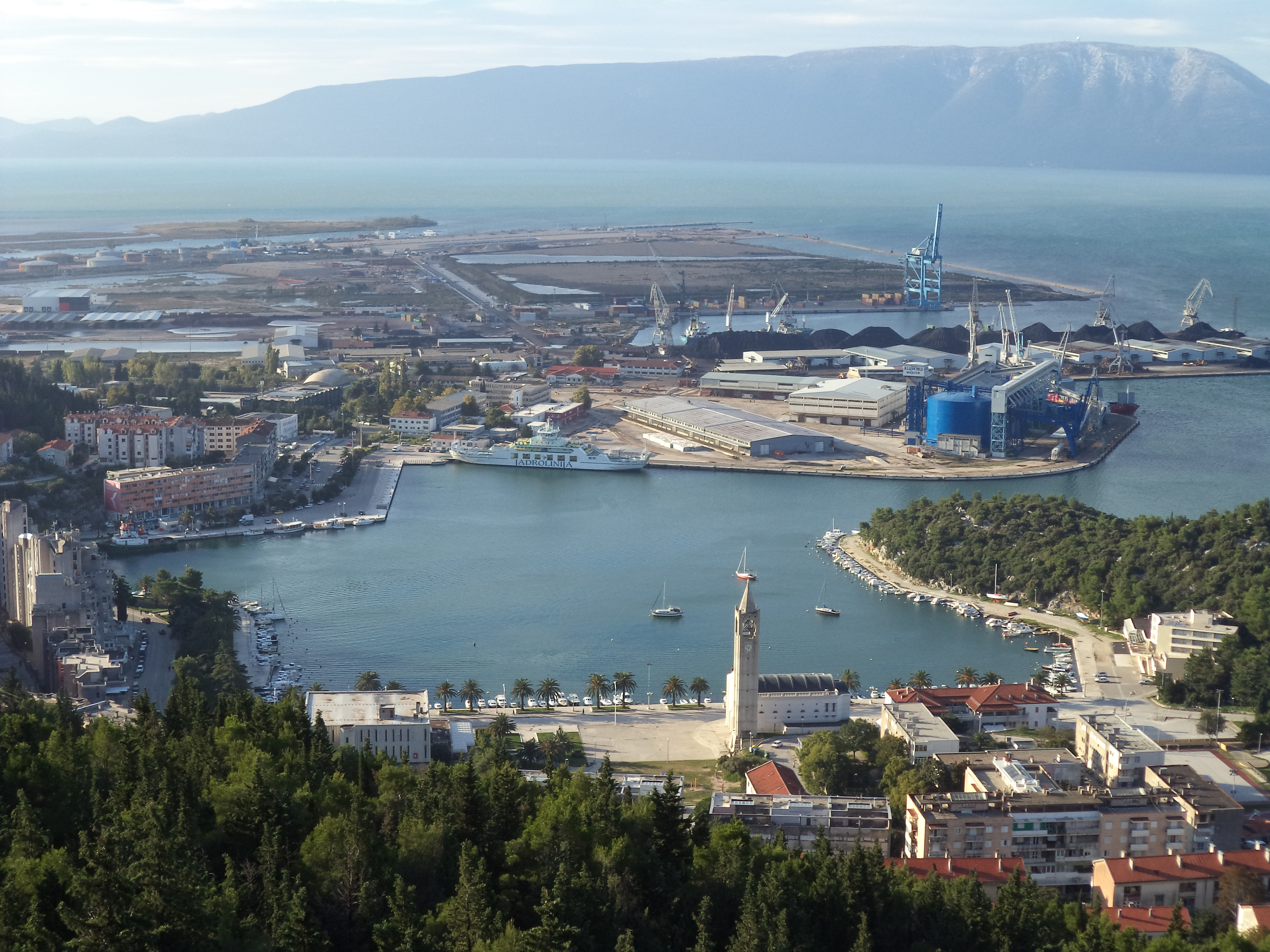
The Ploče Port

Beyond Corridor Vc, the two governments have used treaties to regulate additional cross-border transport links and their upkeep. Agreements have covered the construction of an interstate bridge over the Sava near Gradiška and adjoining cross-border road sections, as well as arrangements on the maintenance and reconstruction of road bridges on the state border, including the reconstruction of the Gunja (Croatia) to Brčko (Bosnia and Herzegovina) bridge. Cooperation has also included rail and port-access arrangements, including an agreement on restoring border rail transport, an agreement on the utilisation and maintenance of the Bihać–Knin rail line, and a joint statement on the interpretation and application of free transit provisions related to access to the Port of Ploče and transit through the Neum corridor.

=== Trade ===
Exports to Bosnia and Herzegovina amount to 14.4% of Croatia's total, while as of 2007, Bosnia and Herzegovina is the fifth largest trade partner of Croatia. This makes Croatia both the largest importer and exporter of Bosnia and Herzegovina, while Bosnia and Herzegovina is the second largest buyer of Croatian goods. With 343 million convertible marks (US$237 million) of invested foreign capital, Croatia is the largest investor in Bosnia and Herzegovina, topping nearby Slovenia (BAM 302 million; US$208 million) and neighboring Serbia and Montenegro (BAM 122 million; US$84 million). In 2007, the trade between the two countries amounted to 2,517 million US dollars (BAM 3.64 billion; HRK 13.63 billion), a 32% increase from the past year.

Merchandise trade between Bosnia and Herzegovina and Croatia (BHAS; thousand US$)
Year	Exports from Bosnia and Herzegovina to Croatia	Exports from Croatia to Bosnia and Herzegovina	Total trade
2015	524,827	949,095	1,473,922
2016	557,663	915,543	1,473,207
2017	741,762	1,056,114	1,797,876
2018	884,017	1,156,441	2,040,457
2019	801,303	1,156,572	1,957,875
2020	795,934	889,645	1,685,579
2021	1,127,355	1,162,568	2,289,923
2022	1,441,069	1,531,585	2,972,654
2023	1,409,040	1,158,254	2,567,294
2024	1,435,426	1,183,572	2,618,998

=== HT Eronet ownership ===
The third telecommunication company of Bosnia and Herzegovina, HT Eronet, is owned 50.1% by the Federation of Bosnia and Herzegovina and 39% by Hrvatski Telekom. Bosnian Croat politician Dragan Čović had been charged with abuse of power and authority during the privatization of Eronet in 1999, but was acquitted by the FBiH Supreme Court in April 2013. The company is considered to be under heavy political influence by the HDZ BiH party and a source of patronage. A due diligence by international advisors was requested by the IMF as a prior action in 2016, and completed only in early 2019.

=== Cooperation in the EU accession process of Bosnia and Herzegovina ===
A bilateral agreement on cooperation in the EU accession process was signed in 2016.

Croatia has repeatedly supported Bosnia and Herzegovina's European Union accession path and has advocated keeping EU enlargement to the Western Balkans on the EU agenda. During Croatia's Presidency of the Council of the European Union, the EU and Western Balkans leaders adopted the "Zagreb Declaration" (6 May 2020), which reaffirmed the European perspective of the region and outlined enhanced cooperation.

Bosnia and Herzegovina applied for EU membership in 2016 and was granted EU candidate status by the European Council in December 2022, conditional on implementing reform steps identified by the European Commission. Croatian officials publicly backed granting candidate status, including in EU-level debates in 2022.

In January 2024, the Prime Minister of Croatia joined the President of the European Commission and the Prime Minister of the Netherlands in a visit to Bosnia and Herzegovina focused on encouraging reforms ahead of an EU decision on opening accession negotiations. In March 2024, the European Council decided to open accession negotiations with Bosnia and Herzegovina, while linking the adoption of a negotiating framework to the completion of specified reform steps.

Selected EU accession milestones involving Croatia and Bosnia and Herzegovina
Date	Development	Sources
6 May 2020	Zagreb EU–Western Balkans summit held during Croatia's EU Council Presidency; Zagreb Declaration adopted.	
15 Dec 2022	European Council granted EU candidate status to Bosnia and Herzegovina subject to reform steps.	
23 Jan 2024	Joint visit to Sarajevo by the President of the European Commission and the Prime Ministers of Croatia and the Netherlands to encourage reforms for opening accession talks.	
Mar 2024	European Council decided to open accession negotiations with Bosnia and Herzegovina; negotiating framework to follow once required steps are taken.	

=== Energy cooperation ===
Energy-related cooperation has included both project-level arrangements and longer-term infrastructure planning. A 2017 protocol addressed supplying natural gas to the Brod oil refinery end customer via a direct connection to Croatia's gas transmission system at Slobodnica, including conversion of an existing pipeline for gas supply purposes.

A major ongoing initiative has been the Southern Interconnection gas pipeline project, intended to link the gas systems of Croatia and the Federation of Bosnia and Herzegovina and provide Bosnia and Herzegovina with an additional supply route, including potential access to liquefied natural gas delivered through Croatia's Krk terminal. The project has been developed in cooperation between Croatia's transmission operator Plinacro and the Federation operator BH-Gas.

The project has also been politically contested within the Federation of Bosnia and Herzegovina, including disputes over governance and which operator should be responsible for implementation. The legislative process faced prolonged obstruction from the HDZ BiH, whose leader Dragan Čović withdrew party support in summer 2023 and demanded a separate Mostar-based transmission system operator to ensure Croat control over infrastructure in Herzegovina. Reuters has described the pipeline as a subject of domestic political dispute and international pressure, including U.S. engagement urging Bosnian Croat leaders to allow the project to proceed. An analysis by the Centre for Eastern Studies (OSW) similarly noted that planned gas connections with Croatia have been linked to political disputes along ethnic lines within Bosnia and Herzegovina.

=== Minority protections and cultural ties ===
The constitutional framework of Bosnia and Herzegovina recognises Bosniaks, Croats and Serbs as constituent peoples, which has shaped bilateral political engagement on minority-related questions and cultural ties, particularly regarding Bosnian Croats and broader cross-border community links. In Croatia, minority rights are governed by the Constitutional Law on the Rights of National Minorities, which provides a legal framework for representation and cultural autonomy for recognised minorities, including the Bosniak national minority. In 2025, the Croatian government announced the establishment of a commission for implementation of an operational programme for the Bosniak national minority, as part of government programming for national minority policies.

Bilateral cultural and societal links have also been supported through treaty-based cooperation, including a treaty on cultural, educational and sport cooperation and a treaty on scientific and technological cooperation concluded in 2002, as well as later sectoral memoranda such as cooperation in the field of youth and in tourism. Cross-border cultural and local development projects have additionally been supported under the Interreg IPA Croatia-Bosnia and Herzegovina-Montenegro cross-border cooperation framework, which includes measures relevant to cultural heritage, tourism and local services in eligible border areas.

Croatia has also funded programmes and projects intended to support Croats in Bosnia and Herzegovina, including in education, culture, science and health, as part of a government programme described as being of strategic interest for maintaining equality and supporting the continued presence of Croats in Bosnia and Herzegovina. In July 2024, Croatia's government announced the allocation of €6.5 million for projects of interest to Croats in Bosnia and Herzegovina across multiple sectors, including education, culture and health. Such programmes are administered through Croatian state institutions responsible for relations with Croats outside Croatia and are frequently cited in bilateral discourse alongside constitutional questions related to Croat political representation within Bosnia and Herzegovina.

=== Security and regional stability ===
Croatia and Bosnia and Herzegovina have established structured police and border-security cooperation through a combination of agreements and operational protocols. These include an agreement on cooperation in state border control and a set of 2008 protocols providing for mixed patrols along the joint border, deployment of liaison officers, establishment of joint crime-fighting groups, and procedures for official transit across the other party's territory for operational purposes. Broader security cooperation has included treaties addressing terrorism, smuggling, drug abuse and organised crime, as well as an agreement on fighting cross-border crime, and cooperation instruments between prosecutors on the prosecution of war crimes.

In the context of migration and external border management after Croatia joined the Schengen Area, developments affecting the Croatia-Bosnia and Herzegovina border have also been linked to Bosnia and Herzegovina's cooperation with European institutions. In June 2025, Reuters reported that Bosnia and Herzegovina signed an agreement with the European Union to strengthen border security, including provisions enabling EU support and deployment of EU border guards to assist in preventing illegal migration and cross-border crime, which is relevant given Croatia's role as the neighbouring EU external border state.

=== Medical cooperation ===
The Ministry of Health of the Republic of Croatia and the Federal Ministry of Health of BiH signed an "Agreement on cooperation in emergency medicine" (Sporazum o suradnji u području hitne medicine) on July 22, 2026. "for the emergency medical care of Croatian citizens at the area of operation of the Institute for Emergency Medicine of the Dubrovnik-Neretva County and the Institute for Emergency Medicine of the Split-Dalmatia County whose life, individual organs or parts of the body are directly endangered due to illness, suffering or injury". The agreement between the Ministry of Health of the Republic of Croatia and the University Clinical Hospital Mostar will, through the "Protocol for the cross-border transport of life-threatened patients", regulate in detail the conditions for providing emergency medical care to Croatian citizens at the University Clinical Hospital Mostar.

== Resident diplomatic missions ==
- Bosnia and Herzegovina has an embassy in Zagreb and a consulate-general in Rijeka.
- Croatia has an embassy in Sarajevo and consulates-general in Banja Luka, Mostar and Tuzla.

== See also ==
- List of Bosnia and Herzegovina–Croatia border crossings
- Bosnia and Herzegovina–NATO relations
- Accession of Bosnia and Herzegovina to the European Union
- Agreement on Succession Issues of the Former Socialist Federal Republic of Yugoslavia
- Agreement on Friendship and Cooperation between Bosnia and Herzegovina and Croatia
- Bosniaks of Croatia
- Croats of Bosnia and Herzegovina
