= Andrijica Šimić =

Herzegovinian hajduk (1833 – 1905)

- Born: Andrija Šimić; 1833; Grude, Bosnia Eyalet, Ottoman Empire
- Died: 5 February 1905 (aged 71–72); Runovići, Kingdom of Dalmatia, Austria-Hungary

Andrija "Andrijica" Šimić (1833 – 5 February 1905) was a Herzegovinian hajduk.

== Biography ==
Andrija Šimić (Andrijica is a diminutive form) was born in Grude, into an ethnic Croat family of seven children: he had a brother and five sisters. At the age of ten, he moved to Mostar to work for the Ottoman aga Tikvina as a wage worker. He worked there until the age of 20, when he returned to his village.

The Ottoman Turkish taxmen harassed the local population, and at one point robbed his father at gunpoint. Andrijica was enraged and decided to become a hajduk, an outlaw, to fight the Turkish government. He was hunted down and imprisoned on several occasions, as he also pillaged and stole from Muslim and Christian wealthy men in the region. His robberies affected not only Ottoman but also Austro-Hungarian territory in inner Dalmatia, so even the Austrian authorities put a warrant for the arrest of him and his group.

He was joined by other young men and evaded the authorities for six years. They aimed to be outlaws in a manner similar to Robin Hood, stealing from the rich and giving to the poor peasants.

The group was pursued by the Austro-Hungarian authorities, and at one point in the village of Zagvozd he shot and killed a member of the police while trying to escape. He fled to the village of Runovići where he found shelter at the Garac family. However, Ante Garac and his wife Kata together with six other villagers tied him up in his sleep and handed him over to the authorities.

When he was finally tried in 1871, they sentenced him to life in prison. He served 33 years in the Koper jail when he was paroled at the age of 68 due to efforts of his stepson Jozo who was a soldier in the Austro-Hungarian Army.

When Andrijica returned to Dalmatia, the citizens of Split celebrated it with three days of festivities and gave him plentiful donations. He decided to travel throughout Dalmatia, telling stories about his escapades to many people on the road.

One day he wandered back into the once fatal village of Runovići, and died there. When he died all the money they found in his pocket was one crown and two para.

Ivan Mimica Zunkalo (1862–1945) served his sentence in prison together with Šimić, and during this time composed 3616 ten-syllable verses of epic poetry which he published in 1892. Šimić was later topic to several other epic songs, lyrical verses, dramas and novels, as well as a 1995 documentary by Croatian Radiotelevision.

The local government in Imotski decided to erect a monument at his grave in Runovići in 1991. The sculpture was cast by the Split artist Ante Strinić.
