= List of ambassadors of Croatia to Bosnia and Herzegovina =

Ambassador Extraordinary and Plenipotentiary of the Republic of Croatia to Bosnia and Herzegovina
- Izvanredni i opunomoćeni veleposlanik Republike Hrvatske u Bosni i Hercegovini
- Incumbent; Ivan Sabolić since July 1, 2019
- Nominator: Government of Croatia
- Appointer: Prime Minister of Croatia and President of Croatia
- Inaugural holder: Zdravko Sančević
- Formation: September 23, 1992

The Croatian Ambassador to Bosnia and Herzegovina conducts the foreign policy of Croatia in Bosnia and Herzegovina. Croatia has an embassy in Sarajevo while Bosnia and Herzegovina has an embassy in Zagreb.

== List ==
#	Ambassador	Term start	Term end
1	Zdravko Sančević	September 29, 1992	January 1, 1996
2	Darinko Bago	January 5, 1996	January 31, 1999
3	Damir Zorić	January 29, 1999	October 31, 2000
4	Josip Vrbošić	May 24, 2001	December 15, 2008
5	Tonči Staničić	December 16, 2008	August 31, 2013
6	Ivan Del Vechio	October 1, 2013	March 8, 2019
7	Ivan Sabolić	July 1, 2019	Incumbent

== See also ==
- List of diplomatic missions of Croatia
- List of diplomatic missions in Bosnia and Herzegovina
- Ambassadors of Croatia
