= Resolution on strengthening the political position of Croats in Bosnia and Herzegovina =

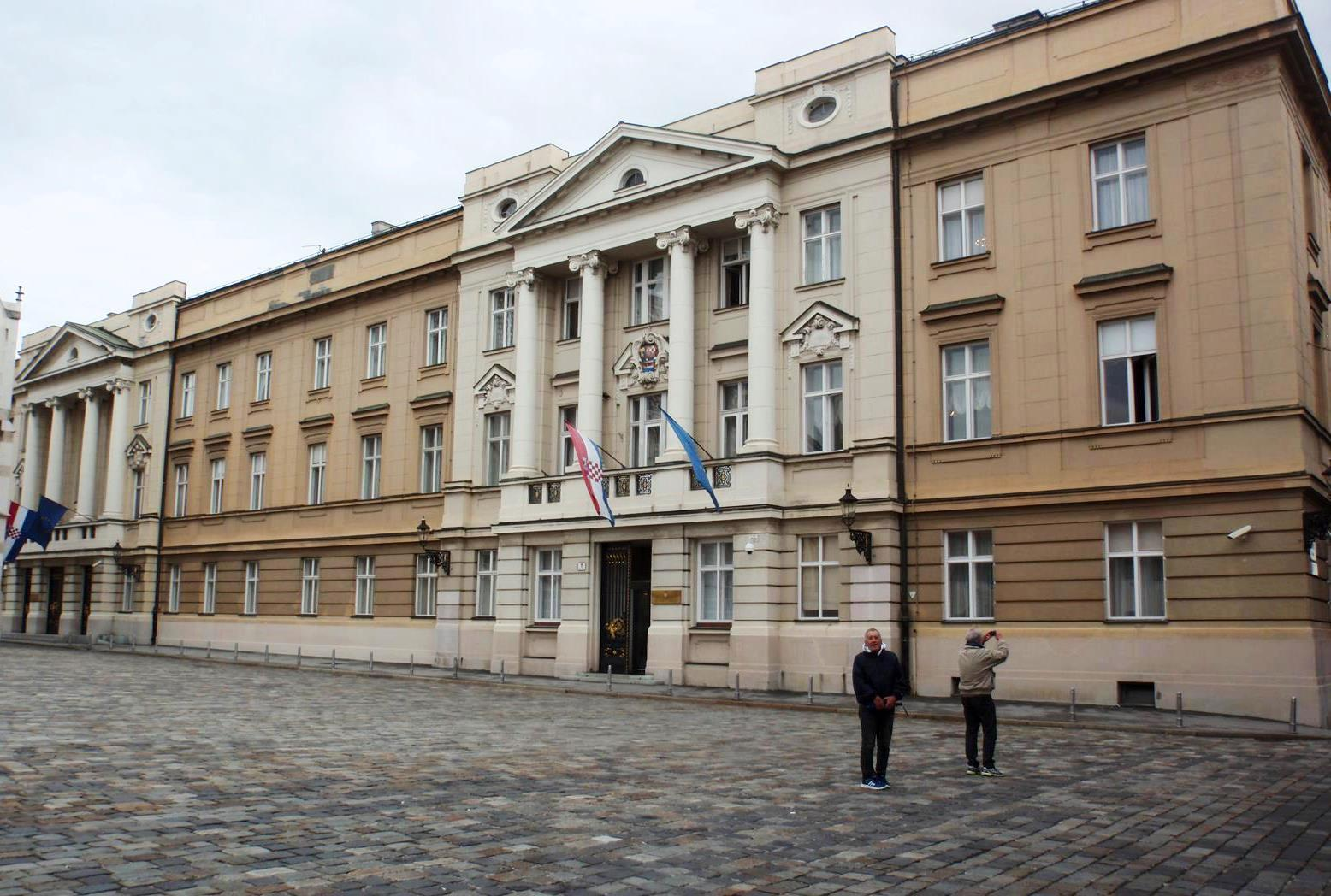

Croatian Parliament
- Citation: Rezolucija o osnaživanju političkoga položaja Hrvata u Bosni i Hercegovini (in Croatian), 22 July 2026
- Enacted: 15 July 2026
- Introduced: 10 July 2026
- Committee responsible: On Croats outside the Republic of Croatia
- Voting summary: 83 voted for; 1 voted against; 3 abstained

The Resolution on strengthening the political position of Croats in Bosnia and Herzegovina (Croatian: Rezolucija o osnaživanju političkoga položaja Hrvata u Bosni i Hercegovini) is a resolution that was passed by the Croatian Parliament on July 15, 2026 aimed at supporting the political equality of Croats in Bosnia and Herzegovina. The first version of the Resolution was published on June 17 by the Homeland Movement. After discussions with their coalition partners, the Croatian Democratic Union, a new version was agreed on, which some criticized as being a watered down version of the original.

The Resolution was introduced in the Parliament on July 10, and was adopted on July 15, with 83 votes in favor, 1 against and 3 abstentions.

== Background ==
On May 27, 2026, the former Secretary General of the Homeland Movement (DP), Josip Dabro, said in an interview with Novi List that his party would seek a resolution from the Croatian Parliament that would commit the Government to a completely different state policy toward Bosnia and Herzegovina concerning Croats in the country.

On June 17, DP published a resolution calling for reforms to the electoral system in Bosnia and Herzegovina through the establishment of a new Croatian electoral unit for electing the Croatian member of the Presidency of Bosnia and Herzegovina. The resolution also called on the Croatian Government to use all available mechanisms within the EU and international organizations, including the right of veto, in order to protect Croats in Bosnia and Herzegovina, while also calling for financial and political support to educational, healthcare, cultural, and media institutions, as well as to the Catholic Church in Bosnia.

The day after the publication of the Resolution, the Prime Minister of Croatia and president of the Croatian Democratic Union (HDZ), Andrej Plenković, said that they had met with the leadership of DP, their coalition partners, and that consultations were underway regarding the final Resolution. On July 9, DP announced that they had reached an agreement with HDZ on the text of the Resolution.

== Legislative history ==
The resolution was officially introduced in the Parliament on July 10, 2026 by the Deputy Club of the Homeland Movement. The parliamentary Committee on Croats outside the Republic of Croatia discussed the Resolution on July 13 and decided to recommend that the Croatian Parliament adopt it in a 6-1 vote.

The debate on the Resolution was held on July 14. The Deputy Club of the Bridge and independent MP Josip Jurčević proposed 8 amendments to the Resolution which sought to restore the original version, which they claimed had been watered down by DP under pressure from HDZ.

On July 15, the Parliament adopted the Resolution with 83 votes in favor, 1 vote against, and 3 abstentions. Left-wing opposition parties mostly did not vote. All of the proposed amendments were rejected.

== Provisions ==
=== Preamble ===
The preamble to the Resolution first quotes article 10 paragraph 2 of the Constitution of Croatia which states that "The Republic of Croatia shall guarantee particular care and protection to those parts of the Croatian nation in other countries". It then states that Croatia was among the first countries to recognize the independence of Bosnia and Herzegovina, that on July 21, 1992, it signed the Friendship Agreement with Bosnia, and that it was the first country to open an embassy in besieged Sarajevo.

It then states that the outbreak of aggression against majority-Croat areas of Bosnia and Herzegovina in the autumn of 1991 led, on November 18, 1991, to the decision of Croats in Bosnia and Herzegovina to establish the Croatian Community of Herzeg-Bosnia as an institutional framework for the Croatian people's self-defense within Bosnia and Herzegovina, and that it was transformed into the Croatian Republic of Herzeg-Bosnia on August 28, 1993, in order to adapt to the proposed Owen–Stoltenberg plan. It then notes that on March 18, 1994, the Washington Agreement was concluded, establishing the Federation of Bosnia and Herzegovina on territory with a majority Croat and Bosniak population, and that Herzeg-Bosnia was formally integrated into the Federation through its self-dissolution on August 14, 1996.

The preamble then notes the role of the Croatian Defence Council (HVO) and the Croatian Army in the defense of the Croatian people and the liberation of occupied areas of Bosnia and Herzegovina, particularly in Operations Summer '95, Mistral 2, and Southern Move.

It then takes into account that, as a co-signatory of the Washington Agreement and the Dayton Agreement, Croatia is obligated to respect the provisions of those agreements and to advocate for their consistent implementation, and that decisions by former international representatives have undermined the equality of Croats in Bosnia and Herzegovina by departing from those agreements.

The preamble then highlights that, according to the European Union's Strategic Compass for Security and Defence, "it is of particular interest to support the sovereignty, unity and territorial integrity of Bosnia and Herzegovina, based on the principles of equality and non-discrimination of all citizens and constituent peoples". It then references European Parliament resolutions calling for consideration of the "principles of federalism, decentralization, and legitimate representation, in order to guarantee that all citizens can run as candidates, be elected, and hold office at all political levels under equal conditions", and that the electoral system must "provide all three constituent peoples and all other citizens with the opportunity to freely and autonomously elect their legitimate political representatives to institutions and authorities". It then mentions the rulings of the European Court of Human Rights and of the Constitutional Court of Bosnia and Herzegovina on legitimate political representation at all levels.

The preamble finally expresses regret that certain leading political representatives in Bosnia and Herzegovina systematically reject the possibility of agreement on amendments to the electoral system and constitutional reforms that would ensure the political equality of Croats with the other constituent peoples in Bosnia and Herzegovina, but also welcomes those who support solutions that would lead to the equality of Croats in Bosnia and Herzegovina.

=== Resolution ===
With the Resolution, the Croatian Parliament assesses that the Croatian people in Bosnia and Herzegovina do not currently fully exercise their constitutionally guaranteed status as a constituent nation, nor can they currently be considered fully equal in rights with the other two constituent nations.

The Parliament calls on the Croatian Government to continue providing support to educational, healthcare, cultural, religious, and media institutions of Croats in Bosnia and Herzegovina, in accordance with the 2018 Declaration of the Croatian Parliament on the Position of the Croatian People in Bosnia and Herzegovina. The Government is also called to encourage reforms of the electoral system, particularly in the election of the Croatian member of the Presidency of Bosnia and Herzegovina, where a separate electoral unit for Croats should be established, to support Bosnia and Herzegovina's accession to the EU, and to use all available mechanisms within the EU and international organizations in order to protect the interests of Croats in Bosnia and Herzegovina.

With the Resolution, the Parliament also condemns open calls for electoral engineering aimed at outvoting Croats in elections in Bosnia and Herzegovina, and encourages Croats in Bosnia and Herzegovina to vote in the 2026 general elections.

Finally, the Parliament calls on all state institutions of Croatia to continue cooperation with the Croatian National Assembly, and calls for continued cooperation with the Parliamentary Assembly of Bosnia and Herzegovina.
