= Luka Ploče =

Luka Ploče d.d.
- Company type: Public
- Traded as: ZSE: LKPC
- ISIN: HRLKPCRA0005
- Industry: Shipping
- Founded: 1952 (founded as Luke i skladišta; privatised and publicly floated in 2003)
- Headquarters: Ploče, Croatia
- Website: www.luka-ploce.hr

Luka Ploče (English: Port of Ploče) is a Croatian port operating company which operates port facilities at the port of Ploče, in southern Croatia. It is listed on the Zagreb Stock Exchange.
