= Podosoje, Runovići =

Settlement in Split-Dalmatia County, Croatia

Podosoje
- Settlement
- Interactive map of Podosoje
- Location of Podosoje in Croatia
- Coordinates: 43°22′12″N 17°12′47″E
- Country: Croatia
- County: Split-Dalmatia
- Municipality: Runovići

Area
  - Total: 7.9 km^{2} (3.1 sq mi)

Population (2021)
  - Total: 25
  - Density: 3.2/km^{2} (8.2/sq mi)
- Time zone: UTC+1 (CET)
  - Summer (DST): UTC+2 (CEST)
- Postal code: 21260 Imotski
- Area code: +385 (0)21

Podosoje is a settlement in the Municipality of Runovići in Croatia. In 2021, its population was 25.

== Demographics ==
Podosoje: Population trends 1857–2021
v

population			54	62	82	175	330	432	229	410	403	321	149	73	48	40	25
	1857	1869	1880	1890	1900	1910	1921	1931	1948	1953	1961	1971	1981	1991	2001	2011	2021

Sources: Croatian Bureau of Statistics publications
