= List of diplomatic missions in Bosnia and Herzegovina =

This article lists diplomatic missions resident in Bosnia and Herzegovina. At present, the capital city of Sarajevo hosts 47 embassies. Several other countries have non-resident embassies accredited from other regional capitals, such as Vienna and Budapest, for diplomatic and consular purposes.

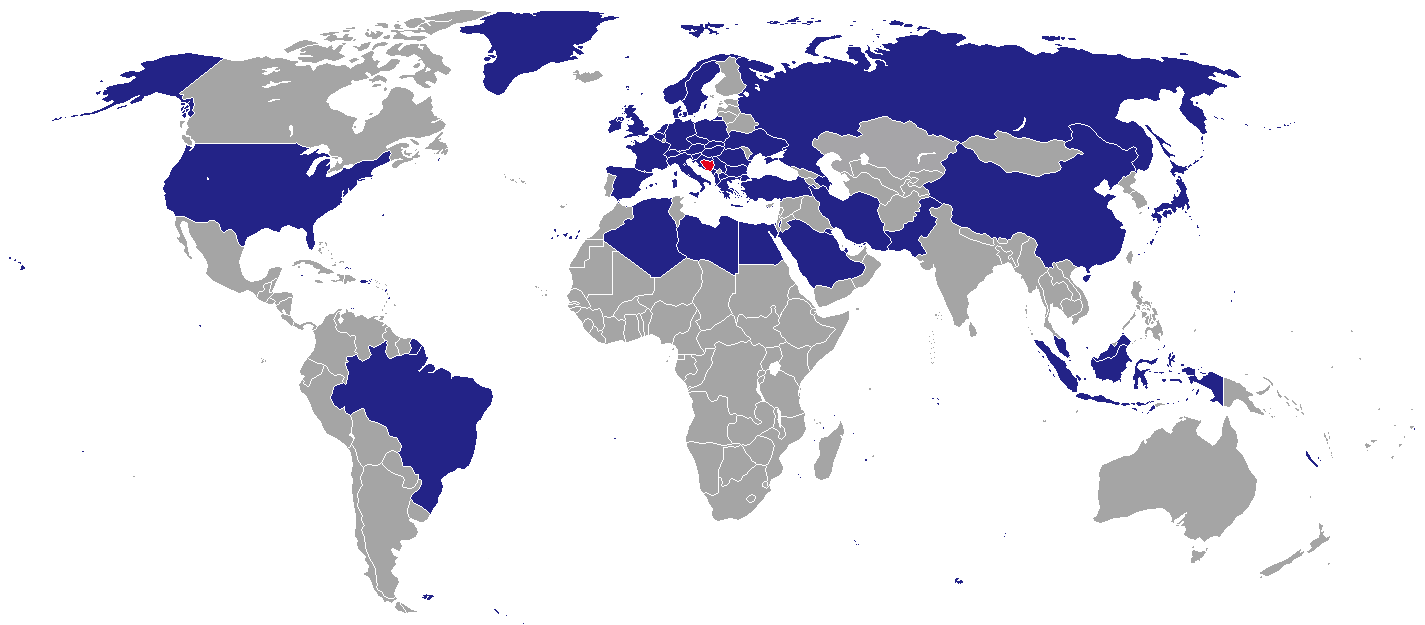
Map of diplomatic missions in Bosnia and Herzegovina

== Embassies in Sarajevo ==
Sending Country	Mission	Year opened	Photo
Albania	Embassy	2025	
Algeria	Embassy	2022	
Austria	Embassy	1993	
Azerbaijan	Embassy	2012	
Brazil	Embassy	2011	
Bulgaria	Embassy	1996	
China	Embassy	1995	
Croatia	Embassy	1992	
Czech Republic	Embassy	1994	
Denmark	Embassy		
Egypt	Embassy	1996	
France	Embassy	1993	
Germany	Embassy	1993	
Greece	Embassy	1996	
Holy See	Apostolic Nunciature	1992	
Hungary	Embassy	1993	
Indonesia	Embassy	2010	
Iran	Embassy	2004	
Ireland	Embassy	2025	
Italy	Embassy	1993	
Japan	Embassy	1998	
Kuwait	Embassy	2018	
Libya	Embassy	1998	
Malaysia	Embassy	1996	
Montenegro	Embassy	2006	
Netherlands	Embassy	1994	
North Macedonia	Embassy	1995	
Norway	Embassy	1996	
Pakistan	Embassy	1999	
Palestine	Embassy	1999	
Poland	Embassy	1996	
Qatar	Embassy	2007	-
Romania	Embassy	1996	
Russia	Embassy	1995	
San Marino	Embassy	2008	
Saudi Arabia	Embassy	1998	-
Serbia	Embassy	2000	
Slovakia	Embassy	1995	
Slovenia	Embassy	1996	
Sovereign Military Order of Malta	Embassy	1997	-
Spain	Embassy	1999	
Sweden	Embassy	1996	
Switzerland	Embassy	1995	
Turkey	Embassy	1993	
Ukraine	Embassy	2020	-
United Kingdom	Embassy	1993	
United States	Embassy	1994	

== Missions in Sarajevo ==
Mission	Mission type	Photo
European Union	Delegation	
United Nations	Mission	

== Representatives ==
- South Ossetia (Banja Luka)(Republika Srpska)

== Embassy Branch Offices in other parts of Bosnia and Herzegovina ==
Country	Mission	Host city	Photo
Russia	Embassy Office	Banja Luka	
United Kingdom	Embassy Office	Banja Luka	
United States	Embassy Branch Office	Banja Luka	-
United States	Embassy Branch Office	Mostar	-

== Consular missions in Bosnia and Herzegovina ==
Sending Country	Mission	City	Photo
Croatia	Consulate-General	Banja Luka	
Croatia	Consulate-General	Mostar	
Croatia	Consulate-General	Tuzla	
Croatia	Consulate	Livno	
Croatia	Consulate	Orašje	
Croatia	Consulate	Vitez	
Serbia	Consulate-General	Banja Luka	
Serbia	Consulate-General	Mostar	
Slovenia	Consular Office	Banja Luka	
Turkey	Consulate-General	Banja Luka	
Turkey	Consulate-General	Mostar	

== Embassies to open ==
- South Korea

== Non-resident embassies accredited to Bosnia and Herzegovina ==
=== Resident in Ankara, Turkey ===
1. Brunei
2. Georgia
3. Ghana
4. Sudan

=== Resident in Bern, Switzerland ===
1. Dominican Republic
2. Ecuador
3. Panama

=== Resident in Belgrade, Serbia ===
1. Iraq
2. Mexico
3. Syria

=== Resident in Budapest, Hungary ===
1. Angola
2. Argentina
3. Belarus
4. Canada
5. Chile
6. Colombia
7. Cuba
8. Cyprus
9. Estonia
10. India
11. Laos
12. Lithuania
13. Moldova
14. Nigeria
15. Peru
16. Philippines
17. Portugal
18. Thailand
19. Vietnam

=== Resident in Rome, Italy ===
1. Burkina Faso
2. Ethiopia
3. Guinea
4. Jordan
5. Mali
6. Mauritania
7. New Zealand
8. Oman
9. Paraguay
10. Senegal
11. Tanzania
12. Uganda

=== Resident in Vienna, Austria ===
1. Australia
2. Costa Rica
3. Mongolia
4. Sri Lanka
5. Uzbekistan

=== Resident in Zagreb, Croatia ===
1. Belgium
2. Finland
3. Kazakhstan
4. Morocco
5. South Korea

=== Resident elsewhere ===
1. Armenia (Prague)
2. Bahrain (Moscow)
3. Bangladesh (The Hague)
4. Iceland (Reykjavík)
5. Israel (Tirana)
6. North Korea (Bucharest)
7. Latvia (Prague)
8. Lebanon (Belgrade)
9. Luxembourg (Luxembourg City)
10. Malta (Valletta)
11. Seychelles (Brussels)
12. South Africa (Athens)
13. United Arab Emirates (Podgorica)
14. Uruguay (Warsaw)
15. Yemen (Berlin)
16. Zambia (Paris)

== Closed missions ==
Host city	Sending country	Mission level	Year closed	Ref.
Sarajevo	Belgium	Embassy	2026	
Sarajevo	Canada	Embassy	2010	
Sarajevo	Portugal	Embassy	2012	
Banja Luka	France	Liaison office	2010	
Banja Luka	Germany	Liaison office	2010	

== See also ==
- Foreign relations of Bosnia and Herzegovina
- List of diplomatic missions of Bosnia and Herzegovina
- Visa requirements for Bosnia and Herzegovina citizens
