= Runović =

Settlement in Split-Dalmatia County, Croatia

- Settlement
- Interactive map of Runović
- Location of Runović in Croatia
- Coordinates: 43°22′37″N 17°14′13″E
- Country: Croatia
- County: Split-Dalmatia
- Municipality: Runovići

Area
  - Total: 20.6 km^{2} (8.0 sq mi)

Population (2021)
  - Total: 1,706
  - Density: 82.8/km^{2} (214/sq mi)
- Time zone: UTC+1 (CET)
  - Summer (DST): UTC+2 (CEST)
- Postal code: 21260 Imotski
- Area code: +385 (0)21

Runović is a settlement in the Municipality of Runovići in Croatia. In 2021, its population was 1706.

== Demographics ==
Runović: Population trends 1857–2021
v

population	956	1813	1533	1771	2154	3011	2917	2057	2429	2447	2495	2598	2293	2519	2071	2024	1706
	1857	1869	1880	1890	1900	1910	1921	1931	1948	1953	1961	1971	1981	1991	2001	2011	2021

Sources: Croatian Bureau of Statistics publications
