= Pašin Potok =

Coordinates: 45°11′N 15°46′E

- Village
- Interactive map of Pašin Potok
- Country: Croatia
- County: Karlovac County

Area
  - Total: 3.3 km^{2} (1.3 sq mi)

Population (2021)
  - Total: 160
  - Density: 48/km^{2} (130/sq mi)
- Time zone: UTC+1 (CET)
  - Summer (DST): UTC+2 (CEST)

Pašin Potok is a village in Karlovac County, Croatia.
