= List of ambassadors of Croatia to Serbia =

This is a list of Croatia's ambassadors to Serbia and its predecessor countries. The ambassadors are based in Belgrade.

== List of representatives ==
Ambassadors to the Federal Republic of Yugoslavia

- 1997–1999: Zvonimir Marković
- 2001–2002: Davor Božinović (chargé d'affaires)
- 2002–2004: Davor Božinović

Ambassadors to the State Union of Serbia and Montenegro

- 2004–2006: Tonči Staničić

Ambassadors to the Republic of Serbia

- 2006–2008: Tonči Staničić
- 2008–2013: Željko Kuprešak
- 2013–2017: Gordan Markotić
- 2017–2020: Gordan Bakota
- 2020–present: Hidajet Biščević

== See also ==
- Croatia–Serbia relations
- Foreign relations of Croatia
