= List of ambassadors of Croatia to Sweden =

Ambassador of Croatia to Sweden
- Coat of Arms of the Republic of Croatia
- Incumbent; Dr Siniša Grgić since 17 January 2019
- Ministry of Foreign and European Affairs; Croatian Embassy, Stockholm
- Style: His or Her Excellency (formal); Mr. or Madam Ambassador (informal)
- Reports to: Ministry of Foreign and European Affairs
- Residence: Stockholm, Sweden
- Seat: Zagreb, Croatia
- Nominator: Government of Croatia
- Appointer: President of Croatia
- Term length: until revoked, usually 4 years
- Precursor: Anica Djamić
- Formation: 20 March 1993
- Website: Croatian Embassy, Stockholm

The Ambassador of Croatia to Sweden (known formally as the Ambassador of the Republic of Croatia to the Kingdom of Sweden) is the official representative of the President of Croatia and the Government of Croatia to the King of Sweden and the Government of Sweden. Croatian Ambassador to Sweden is also a non-residence Ambassador to the Republic of Latvia.

== History ==
The Republic of Croatia and the Kingdom of Sweden established diplomatic relations on 29 January 1992, shortly after Sweden recognized Croatia on 16 January 1992, just a day following the recognition by the then member states of the European Community. The Embassy of the Republic of Croatia in Stockholm was established by the decision of Croatian President Franjo Tuđman on 11 March 1992. The Croatian embassy in Stockholm is also accredited to the Republic of Latvia

== List of representatives ==
Name	Period	Title	Notes	Ref
Damir Perinčić	1993–1996	Ambassador	manager and diplomat	
Mladen Ibler	1996–2001	Ambassador	physician, diplomat, publicist, polyglot erudite	
Branko Caratan	2001–2004	Ambassador	politician, diplomat and author	
Svjetlan Berković	2004–2009	Ambassador	diplomat and author	
Vladimir Matek	2009–2014	Ambassador	journalist, diplomat, and author	
Anica Djamić	2014–2018	Ambassador	Croatian President's adviser, diplomat	
Dr Siniša Grgić	2019-	Ambassador	author, entrepreneur, and diplomat	

== See also ==
- Croatia–Sweden relations
