= Prolog, Ljubuški =

Prolog Пролог
- Village
- Location within Bosnia and Herzegovina
- Coordinates: 43°11′06″N 17°26′40″E
- Country: Bosnia and Herzegovina
- Entity: Federation of Bosnia and Herzegovina
- Canton: West Herzegovina
- Municipality: Ljubuški

Area
  - Total: 2.95 sq mi (7.64 km^{2})

Population (2013)
  - Total: 667
  - Density: 226/sq mi (87.3/km^{2})
- Time zone: UTC+1 (CET)
  - Summer (DST): UTC+2 (CEST)

Prolog (Serbian: Пролог) is a village in Bosnia and Herzegovina. According to the 1991 census, the village is located in the municipality of Ljubuški.

== Demographics ==
According to the 2013 census, its population was 667.

Ethnicity in 2013
Ethnicity	Number	Percentage
Croats	659	98.8%
other/undeclared	8	1.2%
Total	667	100%
