= Gabela Polje =

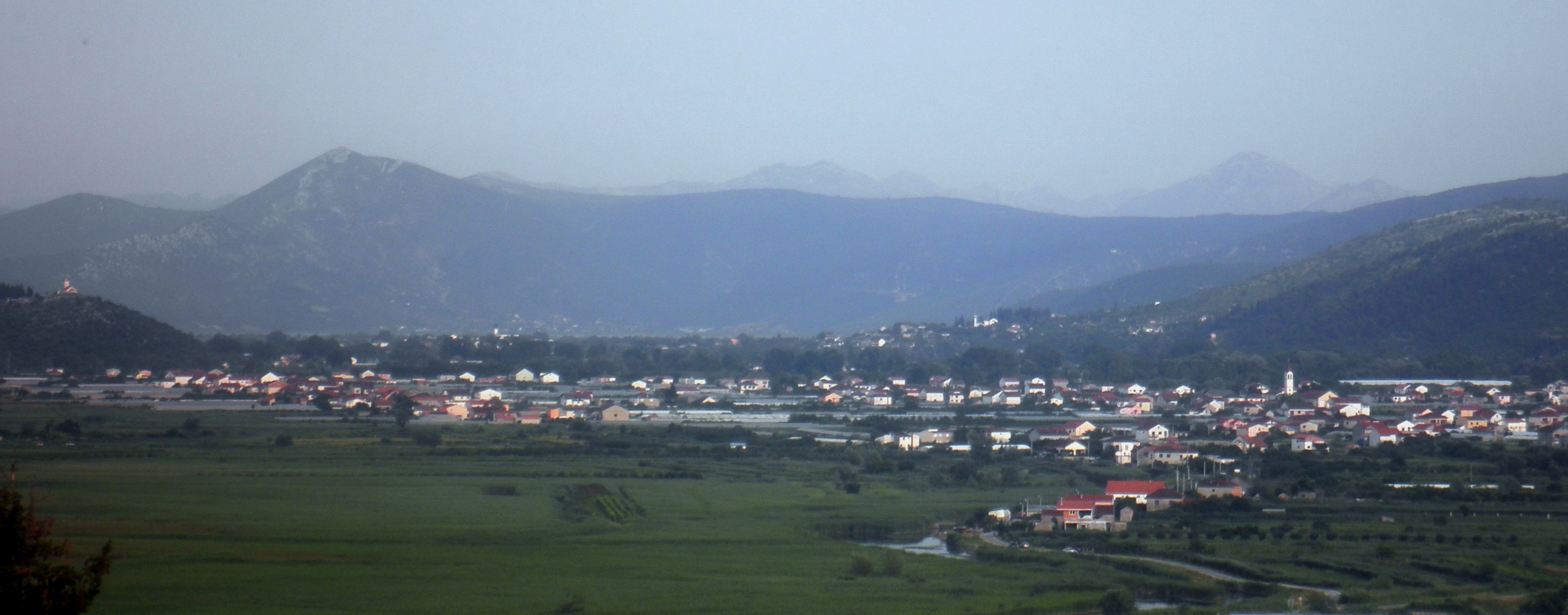

- Location within Bosnia and Herzegovina
- Country: Bosnia and Herzegovina
- Entity: Federation of Bosnia and Herzegovina
- Canton: Herzegovina-Neretva
- Municipality: Čapljina
- Time zone: UTC+1 (CET)
  - Summer (DST): UTC+2 (CEST)

Gabela Polje is a small village in the Čapljina municipality of Herzegovina, part of the Federation of Bosnia and Herzegovina, which is in turn part of Bosnia and Herzegovina.
