= Runovići =

Municipality in Split-Dalmatia County, Croatia

- Municipality
- Općina Runovići; Runovići Municipality
- Location of Runović in Croatia
- Coordinates: 43.38°N 17.24°E
- Country: Croatia
- Region: Dalmatian Hinterland
- County: Split-Dalmatia County

Area
  - Total: 59.3 km^{2} (22.9 sq mi)

Population (2021)
  - Total: 1,968
  - Density: 33.2/km^{2} (86.0/sq mi)
- Time zone: UTC+1 (CET)
  - Summer (DST): UTC+2 (CEST)
- Postal code: 21261
- Vehicle registration: IM
- Website: runovici.hr

Runovići is a municipality in the Split-Dalmatia County.

== Demographics ==
In 2021, the municipality had 1,968 residents in the following 3 settlements:

- Podosoje, population 25
- Runović, population 1706
- Slivno, population 237
Runovići: Population trends 1857–2021
v

population	2087	3073	2988	3482	4207	5134	5130	4229	4531	4764	4603	4638	3718	3497	2643	2416	1968
	1857	1869	1880	1890	1900	1910	1921	1931	1948	1953	1961	1971	1981	1991	2001	2011	2021

Sources: Croatian Bureau of Statistics publications

In 2011, 99.71% of the residents were Croats.
