= Osoje, Posušje =

Osoje
- Village
- Location within Bosnia and Herzegovina
- Coordinates: 43°27′36″N 17°18′36″E
- Country: Bosnia and Herzegovina
- Entity: Federation of Bosnia and Herzegovina
- Canton: West Herzegovina Canton
- Municipality: Posušje

Area
  - Total: 9.00 km^{2} (3.47 sq mi)

Population (2013)
  - Total: 707
  - Density: 78.6/km^{2} (203/sq mi)
- Time zone: UTC+1 (CET)
  - Summer (DST): UTC+2 (CEST)

Osoje is a village in the municipality of Posušje in West Herzegovina Canton, the Federation of Bosnia and Herzegovina, Bosnia and Herzegovina.

== Demographics ==
According to the 2013 census, its population was 707.

Ethnicity in 2013
Ethnicity	Number	Percentage
Croats	703	99.4%
other/undeclared	4	0.6%
Total	707	100%

== Bibliography ==
- Ethnicity/National Affiliation, Religion and Mother Tongue (PDF). Sarajevo: Agency for Statistics of Bosnia and Herzegovina. 2019.
