= Uništa, Bosansko Grahovo =

Uništa
- Village
- Interactive map of Uništa
- Location within Bosnia and Herzegovina
- Coordinates: 44°02′30″N 16°27′05″E
- Country: Bosnia and Herzegovina
- Entity: Federation of Bosnia and Herzegovina
- Canton: Canton 10
- Municipality: Bosansko Grahovo

Area
  - Total: 39.04 km^{2} (15.07 sq mi)

Population (2013)
  - Total: 176
  - Density: 4.51/km^{2} (11.7/sq mi)
- Time zone: UTC+1 (CET)
  - Summer (DST): UTC+2 (CEST)

Uništa is a village in the Municipality of Bosansko Grahovo in Canton 10 of the Federation of Bosnia and Herzegovina, an entity of Bosnia and Herzegovina.

== Location ==
Although administratively part of the Municipality of Bosansko Grahovo, Uništa is more connected to Kijevo, Croatia. Namely, Uništa is c. 70 kilometres away from Bosansko Grahovo, the municipality centre, and only 12 kilometres away from Kijevo, to which Catholic parish they belong. Although the village is situated on the border between Bosnia and Herzegovina and Croatia, there are no border ramps.

== History ==
The border between Croatia and Bosnia and Herzegovina was decided by the Republic of Venice and the Ottoman Empire in 1723.

The Yugoslav Partisans established the Second Dalmatian Proletarian Brigade in Uništa on 3 October 1942.

Due to its isolation from the rest of Bosnia and Herzegovina, Croatia's president Franjo Tuđman and Bosnia and Herzegovina's chairman of the Presidency Alija Izetbegović discussed ceding Uništa to Croatia; however, the discussion was quickly ended by Arbitration Commission of the Peace Conference on Yugoslavia in 1991.

== Demographics ==
According to the 2013 census, its population was 176.

Ethnicity in 2013
| Ethnicity | Number | Percentage |
|---|---|---|
| Croats | 172 | 97.7% |
| Serbs | 4 | 2.3% |
| Total | 176 | 100% |
