= Slivno, Split-Dalmatia County =

Settlement in Split-Dalmatia County, Croatia

Slivno
- Settlement
- Interactive map of Slivno
- Location of Slivno in Croatia
- Coordinates: 43°20′30″N 17°13′04″E
- Country: Croatia
- County: Split-Dalmatia
- Municipality: Runovići

Area
  - Total: 30.8 km^{2} (11.9 sq mi)

Population (2021)
  - Total: 237
  - Density: 7.69/km^{2} (19.9/sq mi)
- Time zone: UTC+1 (CET)
  - Summer (DST): UTC+2 (CEST)
- Postal code: 21270 Zagvozd
- Area code: +385 (0)21

Slivno is a settlement in the Municipality of Runovići in Croatia. In 2021, its population was 237.

== Demographics ==
Slivno: Population trends 1857–2021
v

population	1131	1260	1401	1649	1971	1948	1883	1740	1873	1907	1705	1719	1276	905	524	352	237
	1857	1869	1880	1890	1900	1910	1921	1931	1948	1953	1961	1971	1981	1991	2001	2011	2021

Sources: Croatian Bureau of Statistics publications
