= Port of Ploče =

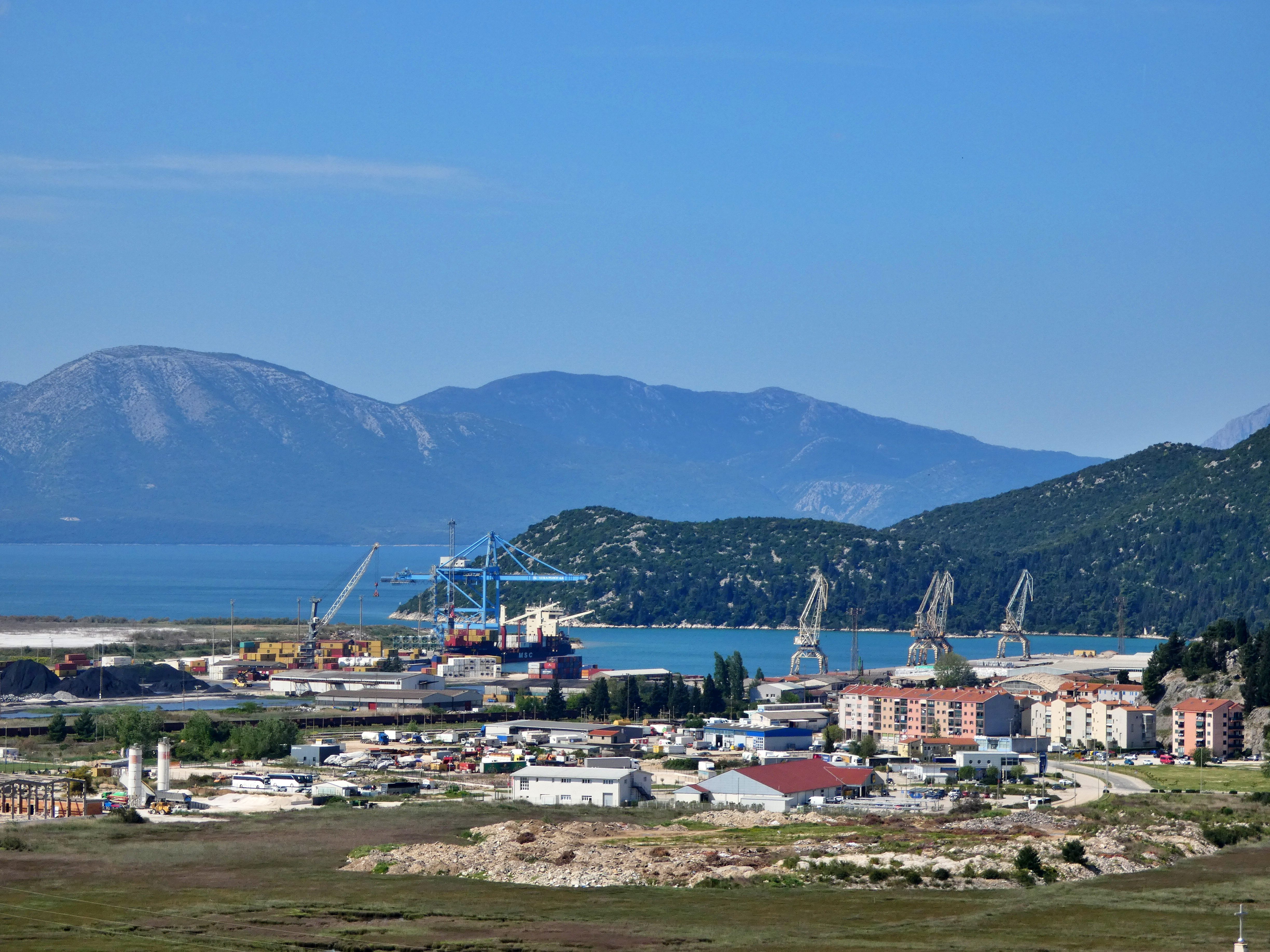
- Part of the Port of Ploče
- Interactive map of Port of Ploče
- Location in Croatia

Location
- Country: Croatia
- Location: Ploče
- Coordinates: 43°03′N 17°26′E
- UN/LOCODE: HRPLE

Details
- Opened: July 15, 1945
- Operated by: Port of Ploče Authority; Luka Ploče d.d.
- Land area: 238 ha (590 acres)
- No. of berths: 16
- Draft depth: 18.0 m.
- Employees: 816 (2010) (Note: The figure includes Luka Ploče d.d. data specified in its published 2010 consolidated financial statement. Figures pertaining to the Port of Ploče Authority itself and other port operators are not included.)
- Director of the Port Authority: Tomislav Batur
- Luka Ploče d.d. chairman: Ivan Pavlović

Statistics
- Vessel arrivals: 2,555 (2008) (Note: The figure includes figures reported by the Croatian Bureau of Statistics and includes two harbors comprising the Port of Ploče, i.e. Ploče and the Metković cargo port. Arrivals in the individual harbors are specified in the article text.)
- Annual cargo tonnage: ▲4.529 million tonnes (2010)
- Annual container volume: ▼20,420 TEU (2010)
- Passenger traffic: 145,945 (2008)
- Annual revenue: ▲157.5 million kuna (2010)
- Net income: ▲15.6 million kuna (2010)
- Website http://www.ppa.hr/

The Port of Ploče (Croatian: Luka Ploče) is a seaport in Ploče, Croatia, near the mouth of the Neretva river on the Adriatic Sea coast. It was formally opened in 1945 after a railway was built as a supply route to connect the site with industrial facilities in the Sarajevo and Mostar areas of Bosnia and Herzegovina, which was then part of Yugoslavia. As of 2010, it ranked as the second largest cargo port in Croatia—after the Port of Rijeka—with a cargo throughput of 4.5 million tonnes, consisting mostly of general cargo and bulk cargo, including 20,420 TEU Containers. In 2008, the Port of Ploče recorded 2,555 ship arrivals. It is managed by the Port of Ploče Authority.

The Port of Ploče recorded a steady growth and development from 1945, but suffered a sharp decline between 1991 and 1996 due to the Croatian War of Independence and the Bosnian War. In the late 2000s, Luka Ploče d.d., the primary concessionaire of the Port of Ploče, embarked on an ambitious investment plan, aiming for a substantial increase in the volume of port operations. Funding was secured in 2007, and Luka Ploče d.d. plans to invest €91 million in port infrastructure and around €180 million in port equipment by 2014.

== History ==
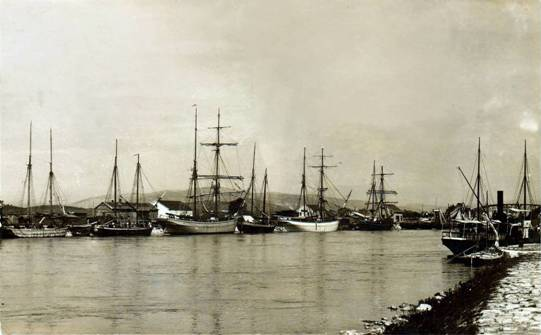
Port of Metković, now a part of the Port of Ploče, between the World Wars

In 1936, it was decided to develop the Port of Ploče, as the site at the mouth of the Neretva on the Adriatic coast represented the natural outlet for the economy of Bosnia and Herzegovina, which was then part of the Kingdom of Yugoslavia. Preparations included the construction of a railway between Metković and Ploče, as an extension of the railway from Sarajevo. The railway was completed in 1942, three years after construction of the port commenced in 1939. The works were delayed by the onset of World War II, but they were intensified in 1945 after modernization of the Sarajevo–Ploče narrow gauge railway.

The port officially started operating on July 15, 1945, handling imports of coal and cereal and exports of bauxite and timber. The railway was rebuilt to standard gauge in 1966, and electric traction was installed in 1969 to increase the port's throughput, which reached one million tonnes within a few years. Development of the port was sustained until 1991, when the Croatian War of Independence and the Bosnian War brought about a five-year decline, affecting not only the port's accessibility but also its primary market. In 1996, Croatia and the Federation of Bosnia and Herzegovina signed the Ploče Agreement, regulating unhindered passage of goods between Bosnia and Herzegovina and the Port of Ploče and stipulating that such cargo should be duty-free. Enforcement of the agreement is related to the duration of the Neum Agreement.

In 2006, Luka Ploče d.d. started developing a new bulk cargo terminal, a new container terminal and a distribution center, implementing IT systems throughout port facilities and operations, and enhancing logistical support to increase the competitiveness of the Ploče transport route. Funding of €91 million was approved on November 20, 2006, consisting of a €58.8 million loan from the World Bank, a €11.2 million loan from the European Bank for Reconstruction and Development and a provision of €21 million by Croatia. By August 2010, €44.2M of the total had been spent, and the new container terminal was opened.

The Port of Ploče Authority was established by the Government of Croatia on February 13, 1997, to oversee construction, maintenance, administration, protection and promotion of the Port of Ploče. Since 1998, the general and bulk cargo operations of the port have been operated by Luka Ploče d.d. and development has resumed. In 2009, after negotiations with the Port of Ploče Authority, Luka Ploče was granted a 32-year extension of the concession contract for the cargo handling operations of the port. The contract requires the port authority to improve port infrastructure and Luka Ploče to invest in new cargo handling equipment. The Croatian government considers the Port of Ploče to be one of six seaports of national interest.

== Transport facilities ==
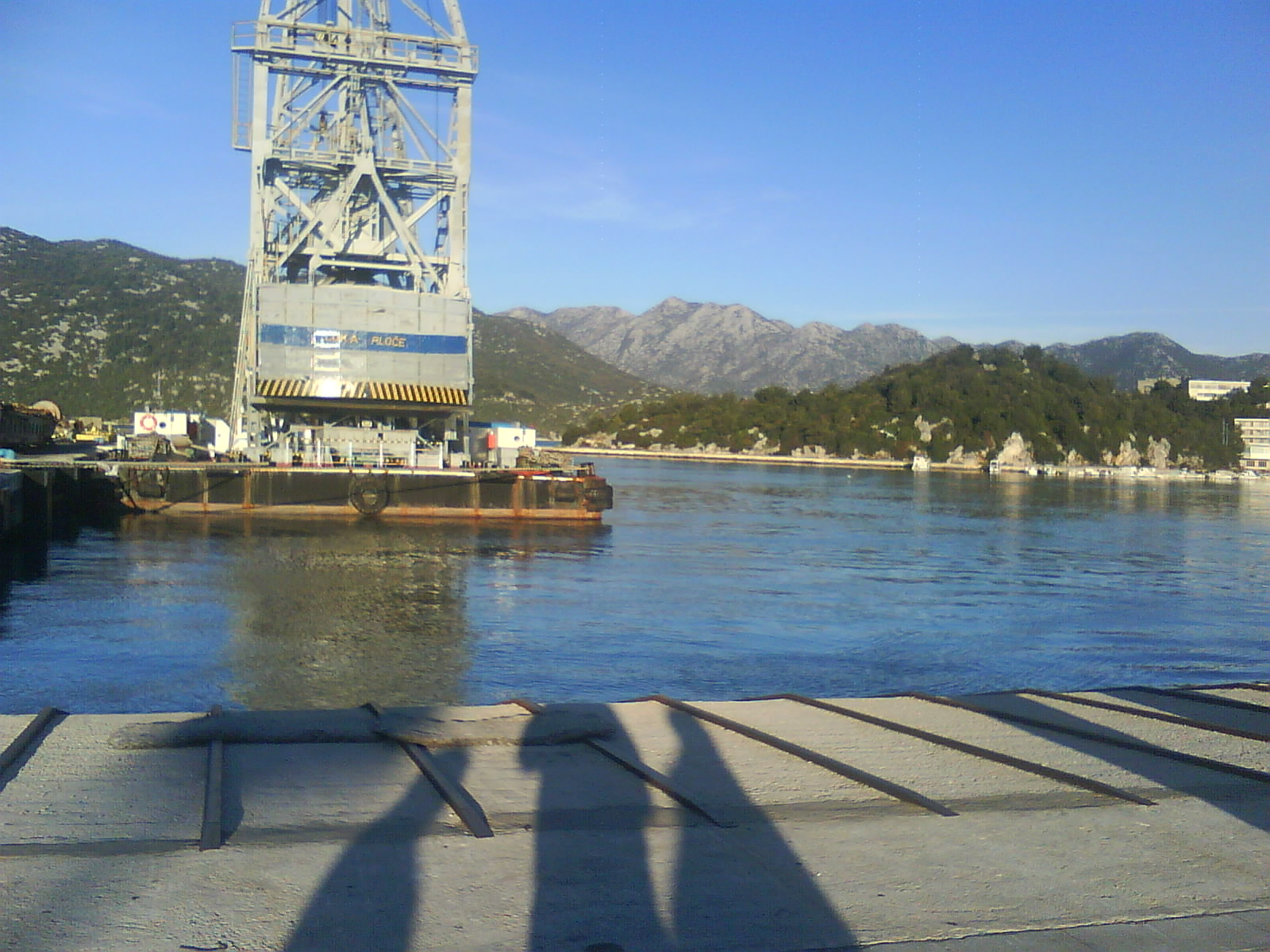
Port of Ploče

The Port of Ploče is located on the Adriatic Sea coast in the area of the Neretva river. Its facilities include terminals and other structures in Ploče and in Metković, which lies on the Neretva approximately 20 kilometres (12 miles) inland to the east of Ploče. The Port of Ploče is at the southern terminus of Pan-European transport corridor V, branch C, representing a maritime extension of the rail and road routes leading to and from the Ploče area. These routes include modern roads such as: the Croatian A1 motorway, accessed via the D425 and D513, forming part of European route E65 and connecting Zagreb, Budapest and Vienna; and the Bosnia and Herzegovina A1 and the planned Croatian A10 motorways, which are parts of European route E73. All the port's quays are linked by tracks connected to a single-track railway to Mostar, Sarajevo, Osijek and further north towards Budapest.

The port comprises several terminals:

- General Cargo Terminal – handles food, cattle food, cotton, tobacco and industrial products; it has processing, packaging and storage facilities, six berths and a 9.2-metre (30 ft) draught.
- Bulk Cargo Terminal – handles coal, iron ore, pig iron, scrap iron, phosphates and cinder; it has storage facilities, three berths and a 13-metre (43 ft) draught, allowing transshipment of 15,000 tonnes (33,000,000 lb) of cargo per day.
- Liquid Cargo Terminal – handles fuel and other liquid cargo; it has 92,000 cubic metres (3,200,000 cubic feet) of storage capacity overall, a single berth and a 12-metre (39 ft) draught. Its cargo storage and handling facilities are operated by Luka Ploče Trgovina d.o.o. and Naftni Terminali Federacije d.o.o. (NTF). NTF is owned by the Federation of Bosnia and Herzegovina.
- Grain Cargo Terminal – handles transshipment, packaging and storage of cereals and oilseeds, with a capacity of 400 tonnes per hour; it has a single berth, 45,000 tonnes (99,000,000 lb) of storage capacity and a 9.8-metre (32 ft) draught.
- Wood Terminal – handles, stores and processes timber; it has a single berth and a 9.2-metre (30 ft) draught.
- Alumina and Petroleum Coke Terminal – handles alumina and petroleum coke; it has a 9.2-metre (30 ft) draught; for alumina it has a storage capacity of 20,000 tonnes and a transshipment capacity of 600 tonnes per hour; for petroleum coke it has 10,000 tonnes (22,000,000 lb) of storage capacity and 260 tonnes per day handling capacity.
- Container Terminal – 43°02′38″N 17°25′38″E handles intermodal containers; it has a roll-on/roll-off ramp and accommodates Panamax ships, although it has a maximum draught of 14.0-metre (45.9 ft). Its annual capacity is 60,000 TEUs
- Bulk Cement Terminal – has 200 tonnes (440,000 lb) per hour handling capacity and 4,000-tonne (8,800,000 lb) storage capacity; it is part of Business Unit Metković, located in Metković on the Neretva river, which is 5 metres (16 feet) deep at the site.
- General Cargo Terminal (Metković) – adjacent to the Bulk Cement Terminal, forming a part of Business Unit Metković.
- Slag Terminal – 10,000-tonne (22,000,000 lb) storage capacity adjacent to the Bulk Cement Terminal, forming a part of Business Unit Metković.
- Passenger Terminal – two moorings: the primary mooring is used for international transport and accommodates vessels up to 120 m (390 ft) LOA (length overall), with an 8-metre (26 ft) draught; the secondary mooring is used for local and international transport and accommodates vessels up to 65 m (213 ft) LOA, with a 5-metre (16 ft) draught.

== Business operations ==
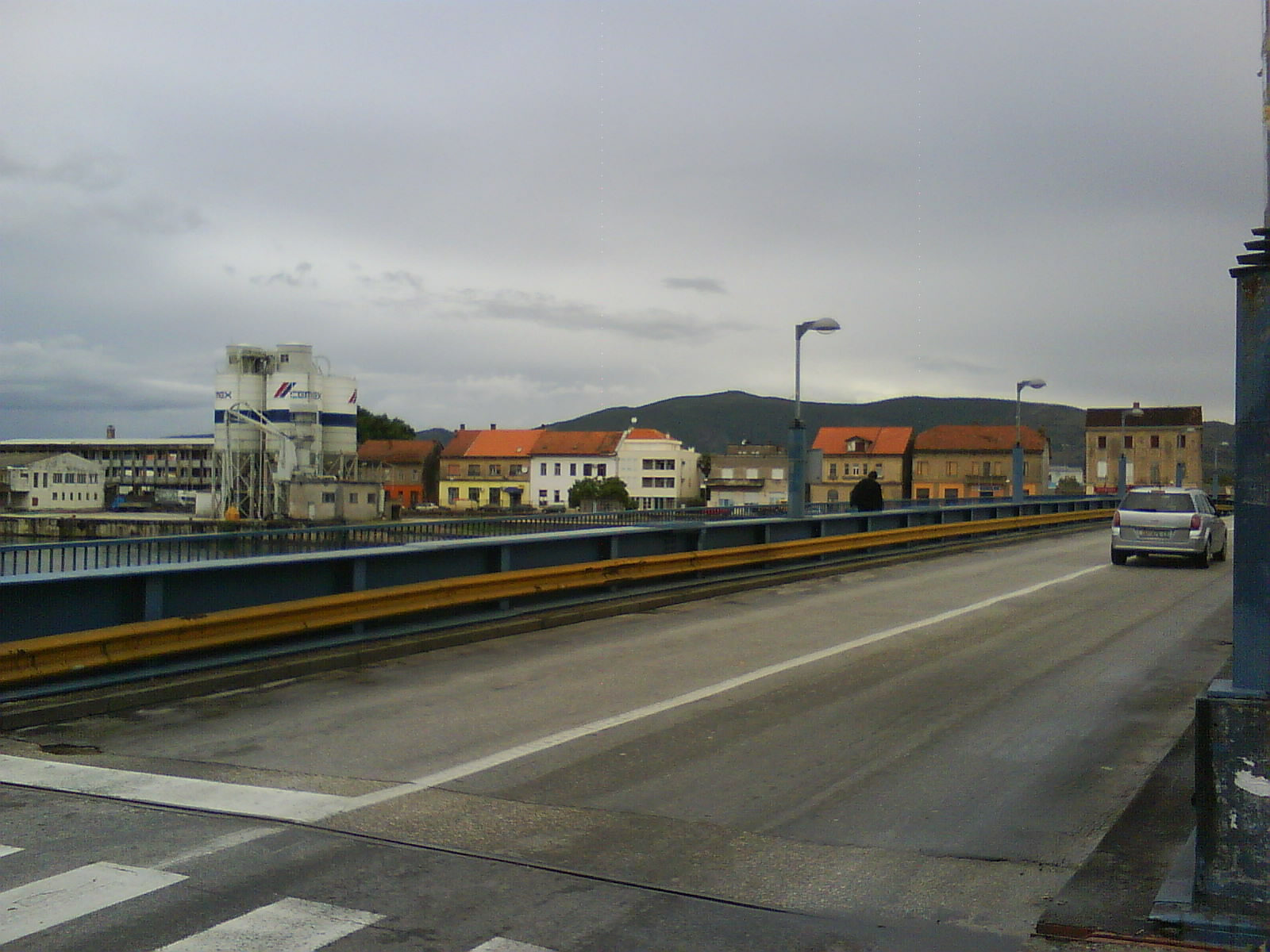
Cement storage silos in the Metković Business Unit

The Port of Ploče is the second largest cargo seaport in Croatia, mostly serving Bosnia and Herzegovina, along with some local and regional users. The port is administered by the Port of Ploče Authority, with Luka Ploče d.d. as the primary concessionaire. Subcontractors that operate the liquid cargo terminal facilities are Naftni Terminali Federacije d.o.o. and Luka Ploče Trgovina d.o.o., while passenger and vehicle transit is handled by Jadrolinija. Jadrolinija ferries sail between Ploče and Trpanj on the Pelješac peninsula and the D415 state road. In 2009, the ferry line carried annual average daily traffic of 143 vehicles. During summer the volume increased to 383 vehicles on average.

In 2008, the Port of Ploče recorded 2,555 ship arrivals, 106 in Metković and the rest in Ploče. In the same period, the Passenger Terminal recorded 145,945 passenger arrivals and departures. As of September 2011, the Director of the Port Authority is Tomislav Batur.

=== Luka Ploče ===
In 2010, Luka Ploče d.d. achieved a cargo transport volume of 4.5 million tonnes (2010), consisting mostly of general cargo and bulk cargo, including 20,420 TEUs. It reported a net profit of 15.6 million kuna (€2.1 million), a fourfold increase from the 3.8M kuna (€0.5M) achieved in the previous year. Total income in 2010 reached 157.5 million kuna (€21.0 million), up from 151.2 million kuna (€20.1 million) in 2009. The company had 816 employees in 2010. It is listed on the Zagreb Stock Exchange with a share capital of 169.19 million kuna (€22.56 million). As of September 2011, Ivan Pavlović is president of the management board, and the company is owned by the Croatian government (11.11 percent), the Croatian Pension Insurance Fund (8.86 percent) and other stockholders, none of which owns more than 8.5 percent of the stock.

In 2009, after negotiations with the Port of Ploče Authority, Luka Ploče was granted a 32-year extension of its concession contract for the cargo handling operations of the port. The contract requires the port authority to improve port infrastructure and Luka Ploče to invest in new cargo handling equipment. Those investments were compensated by extension of the concession period for individual terminals to 45 years. A further increase in cargo volume was reported in the first half of 2011, compared with the same period of 2010.

== Future expansion ==
As of September 2011, only part of the development plan defined by the Port of Ploče Authority in 2006 is completed—the new container terminal opened in 2010, but construction of the new bulk cargo terminal, originally scheduled for completion by 2010, is now planned for 2011–2014. The 5 million tonne-per-year bulk cargo terminal will expand the port area by 20 hectares (49 acres). The new bulk cargo terminal is planned to accommodate ships with a draught of up to 18.5 metres (61 feet), and 200,000 tonnes deadweight (DWT), i.e. Capesize vessels. It aims to attract large quantities of transport for the ArcelorMittal, GIKIL, Birač Zvornik and Aluminij industrial plants in Bosnia and Herzegovina, which are the main users of the port. The ArcelorMittal plant in Zenica alone is expected to ship 1.5 million tonnes of ore and coal, as it would save US$15–20 million in shipping costs.

Further investments beyond construction of the new terminal were planned since 2007 for bulk cargo terminal equipment worth €80M, cargo terminal equipment worth €11 million, replacement of equipment in pre-2007 port facilities valued at €26 million and reconstruction of the liquid cargo terminal worth €70 million. These investments were originally scheduled for 2007–2014, but the pace of development is slower than expected, and delays of a year to two had been observed by 2010. The required superstructure is planned to be funded through build-operate-transfer contracts and public–private partnerships. The investments made since 2007 and those planned as of 2011 are aimed at increasing the port's throughput from 8 to 10 million tonnes of cargo per year.

== See also ==
- Transport in Croatia
