= Embassy of Croatia, Sarajevo =

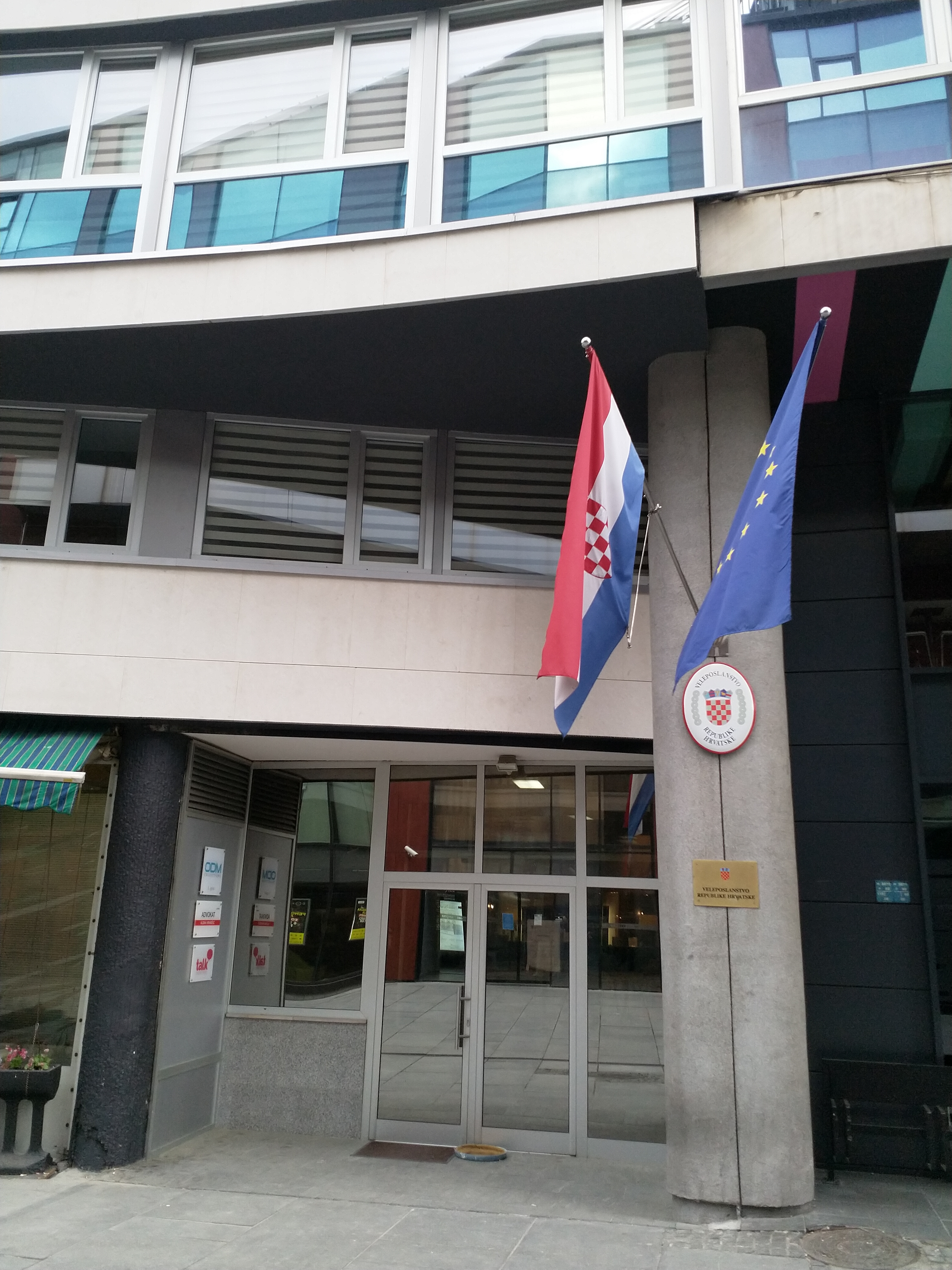
- The embassy in 2020
- Location: Sarajevo
- Address: Marshal Tito street 28
- Coordinates: 43°51′30.4992″N 18°24′57.4524″E
- Opened: June 14, 1994
- Relocated: January 26, 2015
- Ambassador: Ivan Sabolić
- Website: mvep.gov.hr/ba

The Croatian Embassy in Sarajevo is the primary Croatian diplomatic mission to Bosnia and Herzegovina which oversees Bosnia and Herzegovina–Croatia relations. The Embassy represents Croatia in Bosnia and Herzegovina, protects Croatia's interests in Bosnia, as well as those of its citizens and legal entities registered in Croatia, guarantees special care and protection to segments of the Croatian people in Bosnia and Herzegovina, among other duties.

The embassy is located in an office building in the very center of Sarajevo, on the Square of the Children of Sarajevo. The embassy's address is Marshal Tito street 28.

== History ==
The decision to establish the Croatian Embassy in the Republic of Bosnia and Herzegovina, headquartered in Sarajevo, was made by Croatian President Franjo Tuđman on September 23, 1992. However, the embassy did not open for another two years due to the siege of Sarajevo. The Embassy was opened on June 14, 1994, when Tuđman came on his first official visit to Bosnia and Herzegovina.

The Embassy was relocated to its current location on January 26, 2015.

On January 30, 2021, the European Union flag mounted on the façade of the embassy building was taken down and thrown onto the street, while the Croatian flag was not touched.

== See also ==
- List of diplomatic missions of Croatia
- List of ambassadors of Croatia to Bosnia and Herzegovina
