= Duzi =

Duzi may refer to:

- Duzi River, a river in KwaZulu-Natal, South Africa
- Duži, Trebinje, a village in Bosnia and Herzegovina
- Duži Monastery, a Serbian Orthodox church in Herzegovina
- Duži, Neum, a village in Bosnia and Herzegovina
- Duži, Šavnik, a village near Šavnik, Montenegro
