= Duži =

Duži may refer to:

- Duži, Trebinje, a village in Bosnia and Herzegovina
- Duži Monastery, a Serbian Orthodox church in Herzegovina
- Duži, Neum, a village in Bosnia and Herzegovina
- Duži, Šavnik, a village near Šavnik, Montenegro
