= Broćanac =

Broćanac may refer to:

- Broćanac, Croatia, a village near Rakovica
- Broćanac, Neum, a village in Bosnia and Herzegovina
- Broćanac, Posušje, a village in Bosnia and Herzegovina
