= Moševići =

Moševići may refer to the following places in Bosnia and Herzegovina:

- Moševići (Ilijaš), village in Ilijaš municipality
- Moševići (Neum), village in the Neum municipality
