= Donji Zelenikovac =

- Village
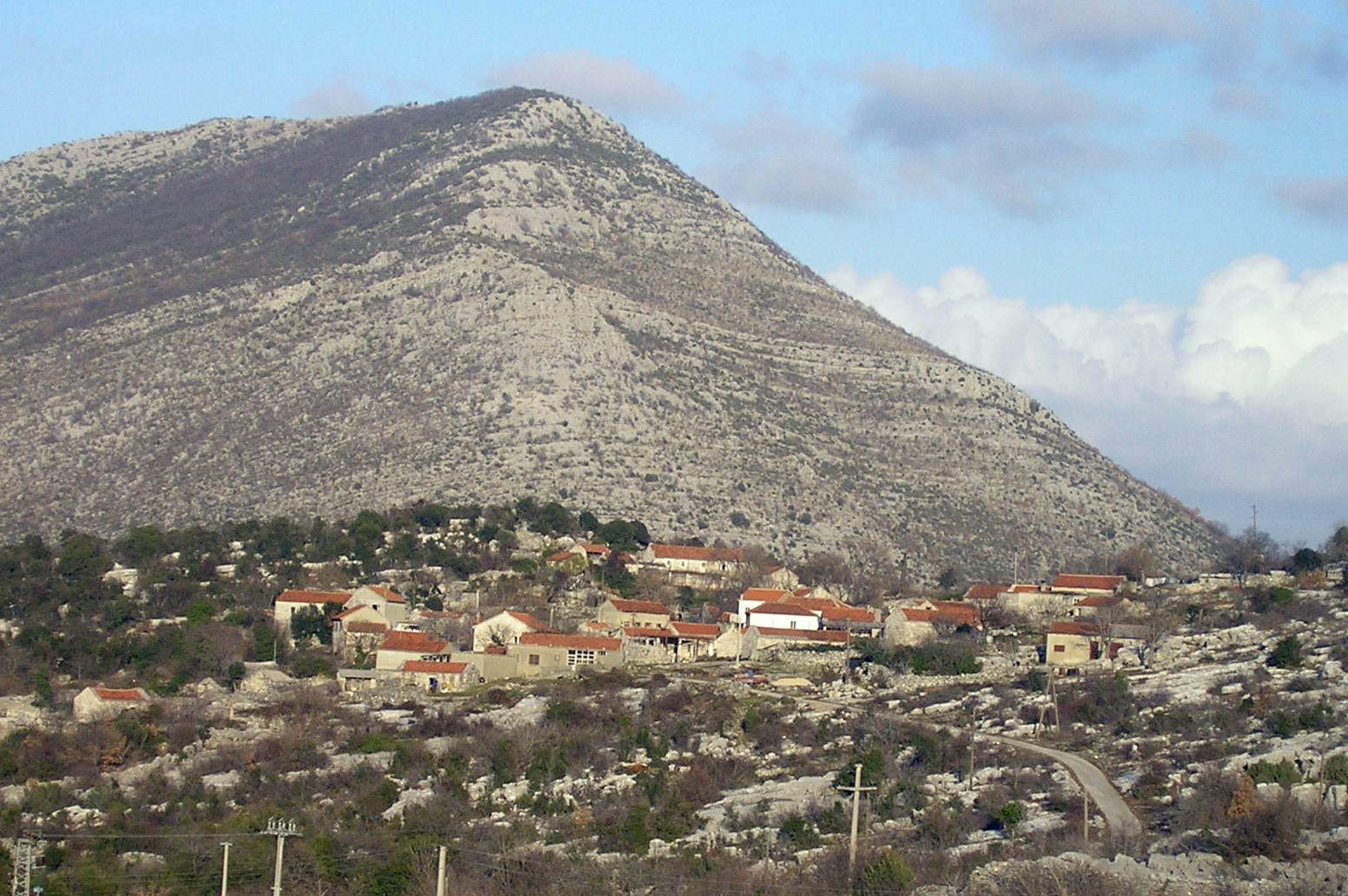

- Location within Bosnia and Herzegovina
- Coordinates: 42°55′51″N 17°48′53″E
- Country: Bosnia and Herzegovina
- Entity: Federation of Bosnia and Herzegovina
- Canton: Herzegovina-Neretva
- Municipality: Neum

Area
  - Total: 2.52 sq mi (6.53 km^{2})

Population (2013)
  - Total: 43
  - Density: 17/sq mi (6.6/km^{2})
- Time zone: UTC+1 (CET)
  - Summer (DST): UTC+2 (CEST)

Donji Zelenikovac is a village in the municipality of Neum, Bosnia and Herzegovina.

== Demographics ==
According to the 2013 census, its population was 43, all Croats.
