= Vinine, Neum =

Vinine
- Village
- Location within Bosnia and Herzegovina
- Coordinates: 42.9867223°N 17.8438303°E
- Country: Bosnia and Herzegovina
- Entity: Federation of Bosnia and Herzegovina
- Canton: Herzegovina-Neretva
- Municipality: Neum

Area
  - Total: 2.35 sq mi (6.08 km^{2})

Population (2013)
  - Total: 49
  - Density: 21/sq mi (8.1/km^{2})
- Time zone: UTC+1 (CET)
  - Summer (DST): UTC+2 (CEST)

Vinine is a village in the municipality of Neum, Bosnia and Herzegovina.

== Demographics ==
According to the 2013 census, its population was 49.

Ethnicity in 2013
Ethnicity	Number	Percentage
Croats	48	98.0%
other/undeclared	1	2.0%
Total	49	100%
