= Rabrani =

- Village
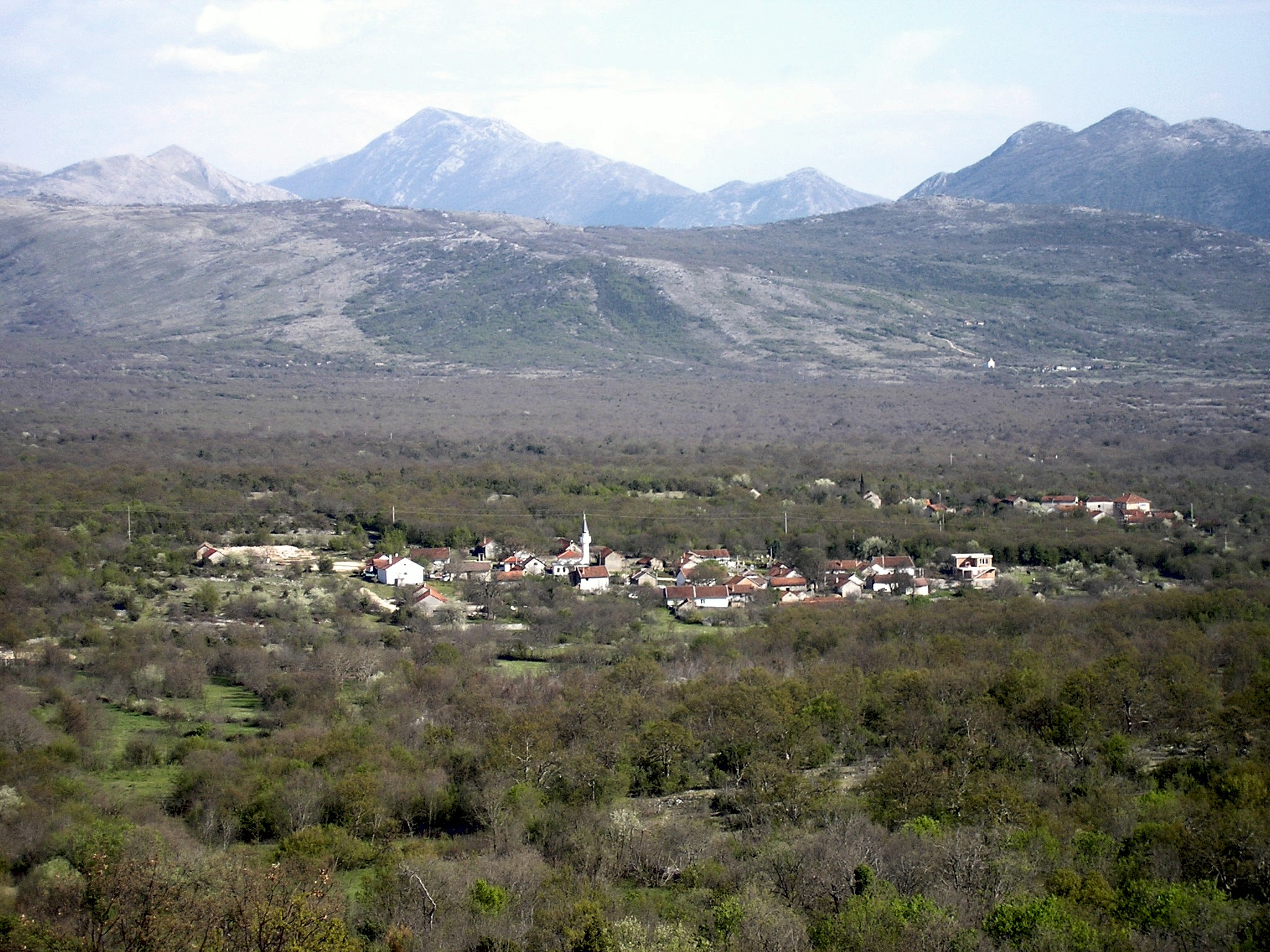

- Location within Bosnia and Herzegovina
- Coordinates: 42.9830465°N 17.872482°E
- Country: Bosnia and Herzegovina
- Entity: Federation of Bosnia and Herzegovina
- Canton: Herzegovina-Neretva
- Municipality: Neum

Area
  - Total: 2.99 sq mi (7.74 km^{2})

Population (2013)
  - Total: 46
  - Density: 15/sq mi (5.9/km^{2})
- Time zone: UTC+1 (CET)
  - Summer (DST): UTC+2 (CEST)

Rabrani is a village in the municipality of Neum in Herzegovina-Neretva Canton of the Federation of Bosnia and Herzegovina, an entity of Bosnia and Herzegovina.

== Demographics ==
According to the 2013 census, its population was 46.

Ethnicity in 2013
Ethnicity	Number	Percentage
Bosniaks	27	58.7%
Croats	19	41.3%
Total	46	100%
