= Gornje Hrasno =

Gornje Hrasno Горње Храсно
- Village
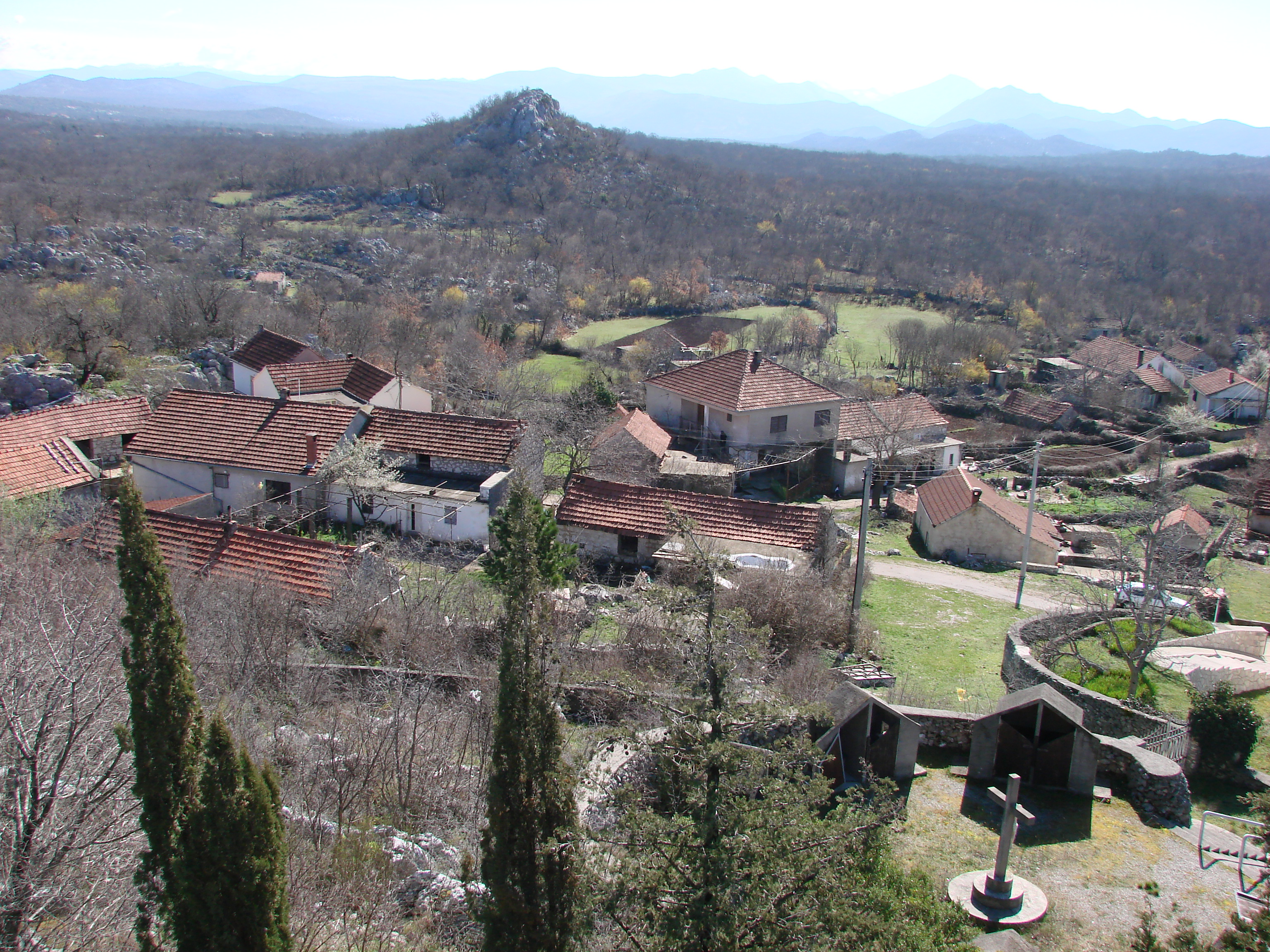
- Gornje Hrasno village

- Location within Bosnia and Herzegovina
- Country: Bosnia and Herzegovina
- Entity: Federation of Bosnia and Herzegovina
- Canton: Herzegovina-Neretva
- Municipality: Neum

Area
  - Total: 12.92 sq mi (33.46 km^{2})

Population (2013)
  - Total: 53
  - Density: 4.1/sq mi (1.6/km^{2})
- Time zone: UTC+1 (CET)
  - Summer (DST): UTC+2 (CEST)

Gornje Hrasno (Serbian Cyrillic: Горње Храсно) is a settlement in the Neum municipality, in Bosnia and Herzegovina.

== Demographics ==
According to the 1991 census, it had a total of 186 inhabitants, out of which 108 were Serbs (58,06%); 73 were Croats (39,25%) and 5 were ethnic Muslims (2,69%). It was the only settlement in Neum with a Serb majority.

According to the 2013 census, its population was 53.

Ethnicity in 2013
Ethnicity	Number	Percentage
Croats	51	96.2%
Bosniaks	2	3.8%
Total	53	100%
