= Donji Drijen =

- Village
- Location within Bosnia and Herzegovina
- Coordinates: 42.9082182°N 17.7837883°E
- Country: Bosnia and Herzegovina
- Entity: Federation of Bosnia and Herzegovina
- Canton: Herzegovina-Neretva
- Municipality: Neum

Area
  - Total: 2.36 sq mi (6.11 km^{2})

Population (2013)
  - Total: 20
  - Density: 8.5/sq mi (3.3/km^{2})
- Time zone: UTC+1 (CET)
  - Summer (DST): UTC+2 (CEST)

Donji Drijen is a village in the municipality of Neum, Bosnia and Herzegovina.

== Demographics ==
According to the 2013 census, its population was 20, all Croats.
