= Prapratnica =

- Village
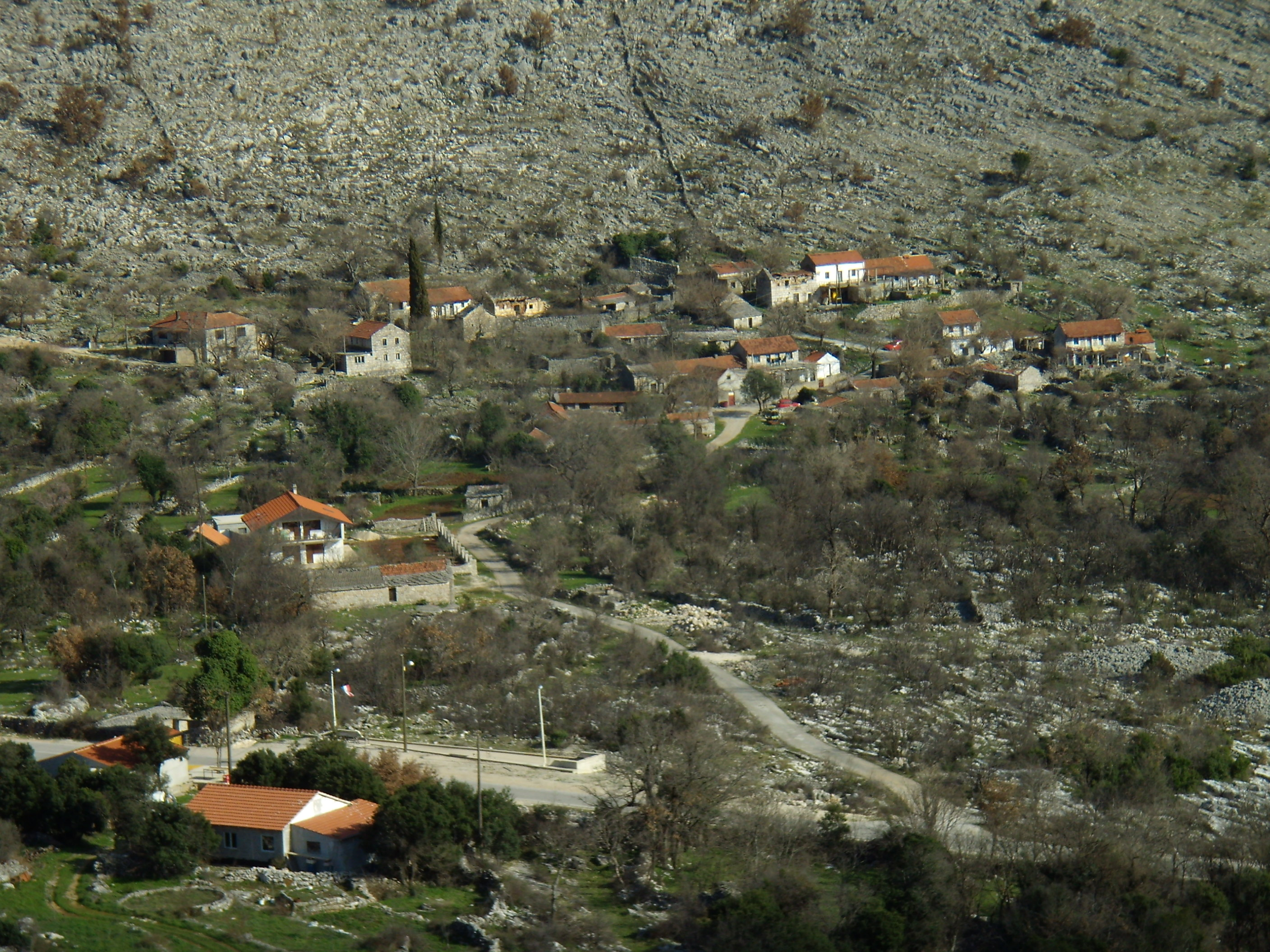

- Location within Bosnia and Herzegovina
- Coordinates: 42.9484484°N 17.7793127°E
- Country: Bosnia and Herzegovina
- Entity: Federation of Bosnia and Herzegovina
- Canton: Herzegovina-Neretva
- Municipality: Neum

Area
  - Total: 2.95 sq mi (7.63 km^{2})

Population (2013)
  - Total: 52
  - Density: 18/sq mi (6.8/km^{2})
- Time zone: UTC+1 (CET)
  - Summer (DST): UTC+2 (CEST)

Prapratnica is a village in the municipality of Neum, Bosnia and Herzegovina.

== Demographics ==
According to the 2013 census, its population was 52, all Croats.
