= Dobri Do, Neum =

Dobri Do
- Village
- Interactive map of Dobri Do
- Location within Bosnia and Herzegovina
- Coordinates: 42°54′38″N 17°50′08″E
- Country: Bosnia and Herzegovina
- Entity: Federation of Bosnia and Herzegovina
- Canton: Herzegovina-Neretva
- Municipality: Neum

Area
  - Total: 2.22 sq mi (5.75 km^{2})

Population (2013)
  - Total: 42
  - Density: 19/sq mi (7.3/km^{2})
- Time zone: UTC+1 (CET)
  - Summer (DST): UTC+2 (CEST)

Dobri Do is a village in the municipality of Neum, Bosnia and Herzegovina.

== Demographics ==
According to the 2013 census, its population was 42.

Ethnicity in 2013
Ethnicity	Number	Percentage
Croats	41	97.6%
other/undeclared	1	2.4%
Total	42	100%
