= Dobrovo, Neum =

Dobrovo
- Village
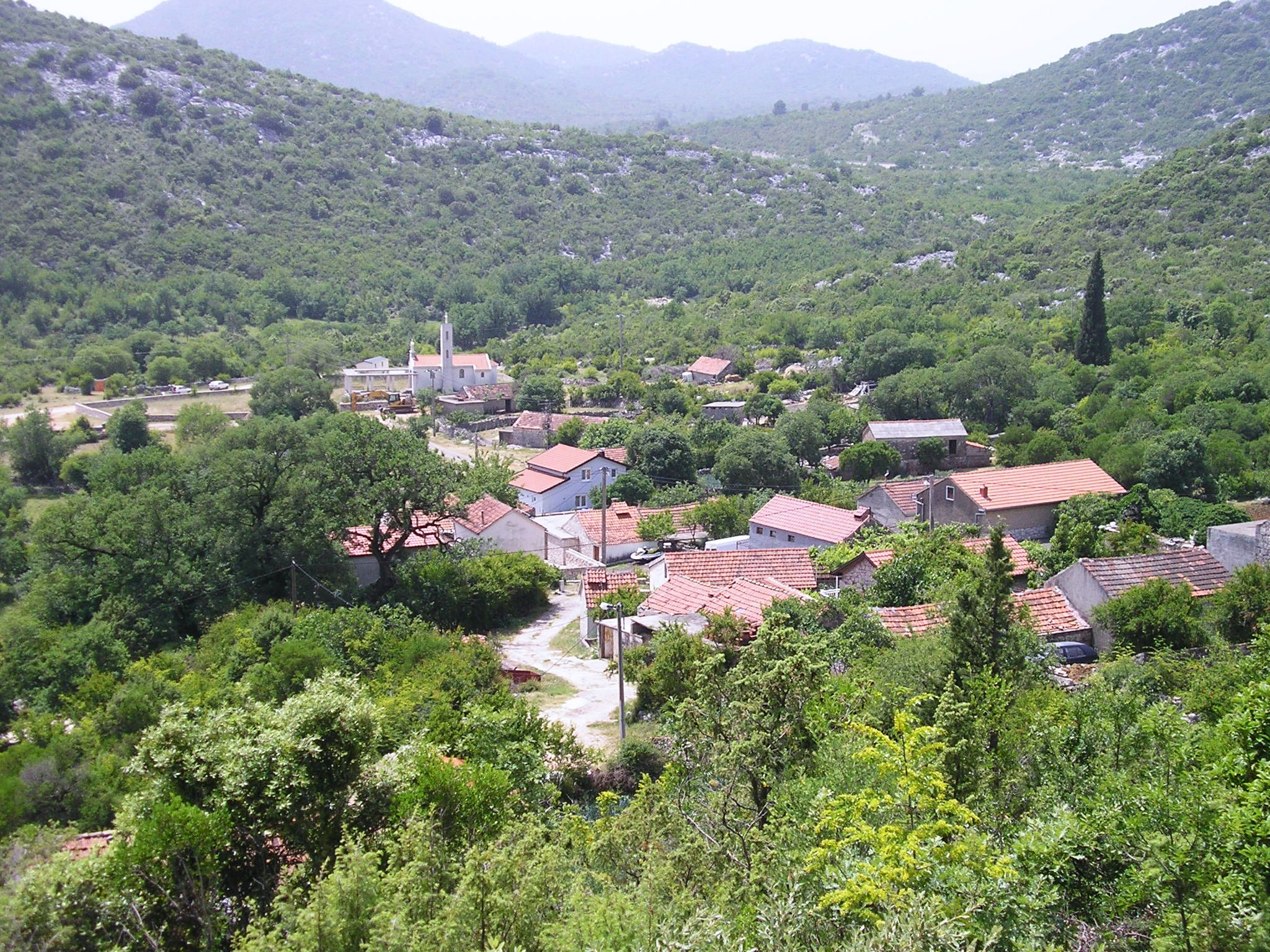
- Dobrovo, Neum

- Location within Bosnia and Herzegovina
- Coordinates: 42.9593699°N 17.6871062°E
- Country: Bosnia and Herzegovina
- Entity: Federation of Bosnia and Herzegovina
- Canton: Herzegovina-Neretva
- Municipality: Neum

Area
  - Total: 3.58 sq mi (9.27 km^{2})

Population (2013)
  - Total: 114
  - Density: 31.9/sq mi (12.3/km^{2})
- Time zone: UTC+1 (CET)
  - Summer (DST): UTC+2 (CEST)

Dobrovo is a village in the municipality of Neum, Bosnia and Herzegovina.

== Demographics ==
According to the 2013 census, its population was 114, all Croats.
