= Previš, Neum =

Previš
- Village
- Location within Bosnia and Herzegovina
- Coordinates: 42.9492679°N 17.8333535°E
- Country: Bosnia and Herzegovina
- Entity: Federation of Bosnia and Herzegovina
- Canton: Herzegovina-Neretva
- Municipality: Neum

Area
  - Total: 1.57 sq mi (4.07 km^{2})

Population (2013)
  - Total: 32
  - Density: 20/sq mi (7.9/km^{2})
- Time zone: UTC+1 (CET)
  - Summer (DST): UTC+2 (CEST)

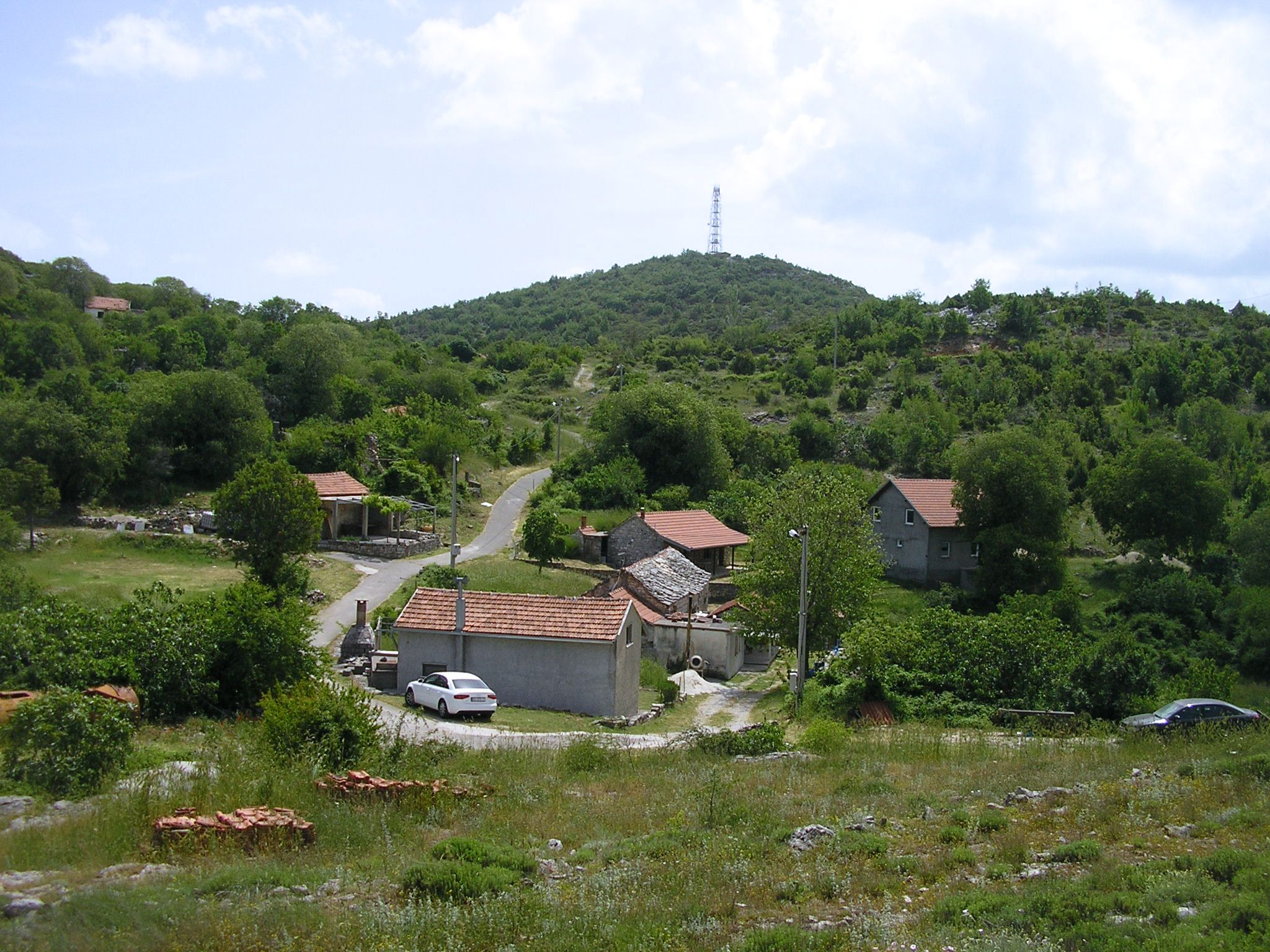

Previš is a village in the municipality of Neum, Bosnia and Herzegovina.

== Demographics ==
According to the 2013 census, its population was 32, all Croats.
