= Borut, Bosnia and Herzegovina =

Borut
- Village
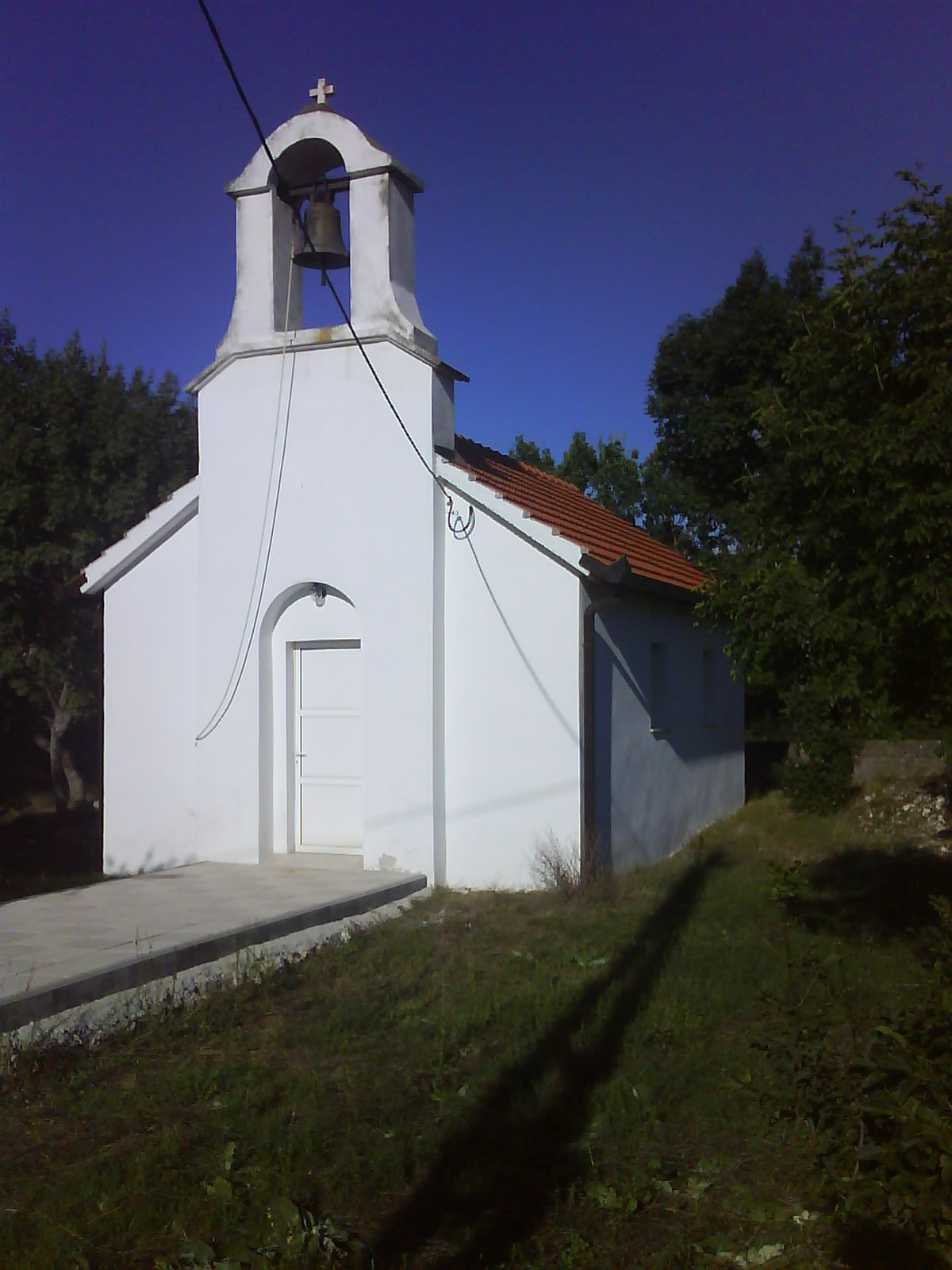

- Location within Bosnia and Herzegovina
- Coordinates: 42.998°N 17.71°E
- Country: Bosnia and Herzegovina
- Entity: Federation of Bosnia and Herzegovina
- Canton: Herzegovina-Neretva
- Municipality: Neum

Area
  - Total: 4.96 sq mi (12.85 km^{2})

Population (2013)
  - Total: 21
  - Density: 4.2/sq mi (1.6/km^{2})
- Time zone: UTC+1 (CET)
  - Summer (DST): UTC+2 (CEST)

Borut is a village in the municipality of Neum, Bosnia and Herzegovina.

== Demographics ==
According to the 2013 census, its population was 21, all Croats.
