= Crnoglav =

- Village
- Location within Bosnia and Herzegovina
- Coordinates: 42°59′25″N 17°52′12″E
- Country: Bosnia and Herzegovina
- Entity: Federation of Bosnia and Herzegovina
- Canton: Herzegovina-Neretva
- Municipality: Neum

Area
  - Total: 1.31 sq mi (3.38 km^{2})

Population (2013)
  - Total: 24
  - Density: 18/sq mi (7.1/km^{2})
- Time zone: UTC+1 (CET)
  - Summer (DST): UTC+2 (CEST)

Crnoglav is a village in the municipality of Neum, Bosnia and Herzegovina.

== Demographics ==
According to the 2013 census, its population was 24, all Croats.
