= Brestica =

- Village
- Location within Bosnia and Herzegovina
- Coordinates: 42.944308°N 17.642786°E
- Country: Bosnia and Herzegovina
- Entity: Federation of Bosnia and Herzegovina
- Canton: Herzegovina-Neretva
- Municipality: Neum

Area
  - Total: 2.88 sq mi (7.45 km^{2})

Population (2013)
  - Total: 8
  - Density: 2.8/sq mi (1.1/km^{2})
- Time zone: UTC+1 (CET)
  - Summer (DST): UTC+2 (CEST)

Brestica is a village in the municipality of Neum, Bosnia and Herzegovina.

== Demographics ==
According to the 2013 census, its population was 8, all Croats.
