= Neum =

Neum Općina Neum (Croatian)
- Town and municipality
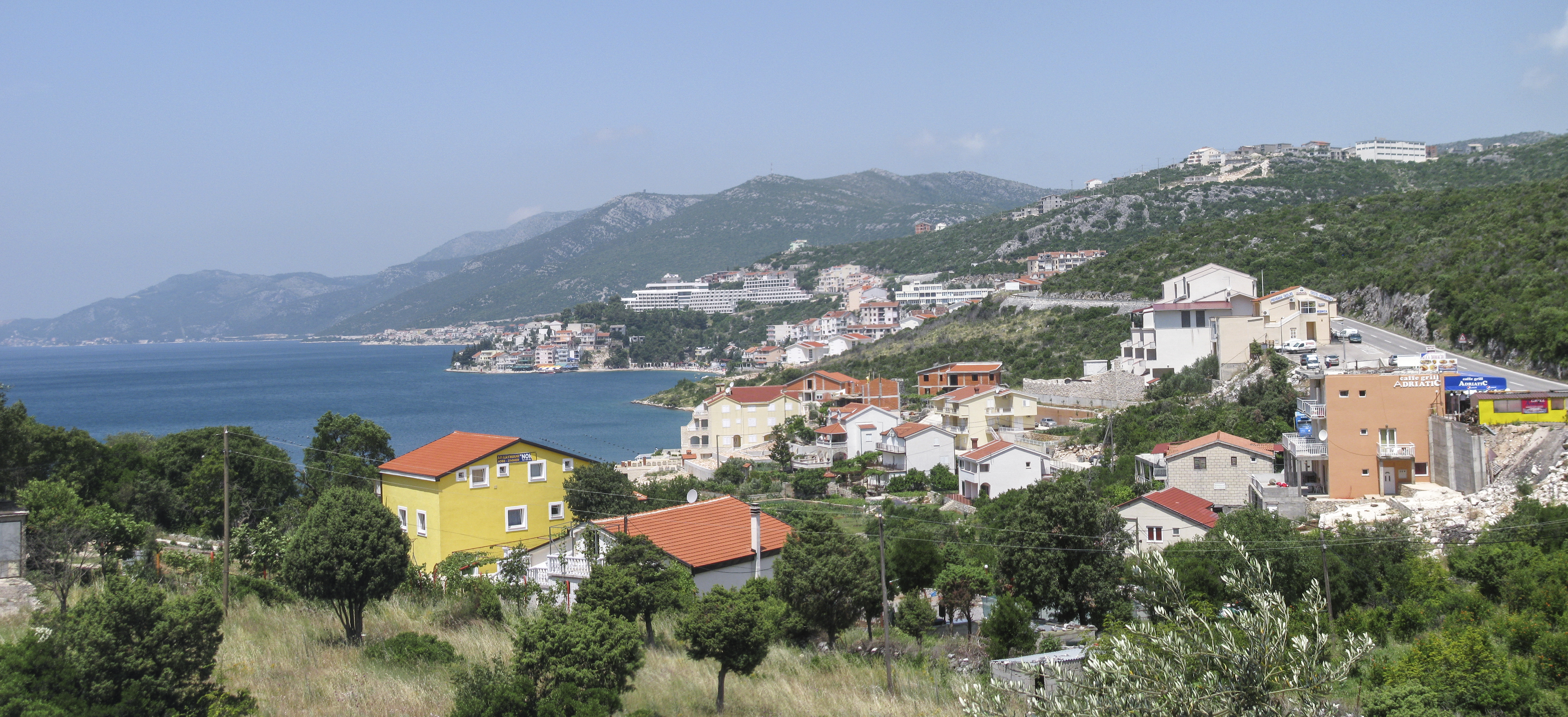
- Neum

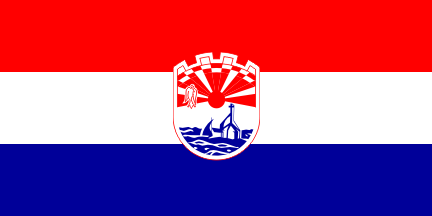
- Flag Coat of arms

- Location of Neum municipality within Bosnia and Herzegovina
- Interactive map of Neum
- Coordinates: 42°55′30″N 17°37′00″E
- Country: Bosnia and Herzegovina
- Entity: Federation of Bosnia and Herzegovina
- Canton: Herzegovina-Neretva
- Geographical region: Herzegovina

Government
  - Municipal mayor: Dragan Jurković (HDZ BiH)

Area
  - Town and municipality: 246.03 km^{2} (94.99 sq mi)

Population (2013 census)
  - Town and municipality: 4,653
  - Density: 22/km^{2} (57/sq mi)
  - Urban: 3,013
  - Rural: 1,640
- Time zone: UTC+1 (CET)
  - Summer (DST): UTC+2 (CEST)
- Area code: +387 36
- Website: www.neum.ba

Neum (pronounced [něum]) is a town and municipality in Bosnia and Herzegovina, located in Herzegovina-Neretva Canton of the Federation of Bosnia and Herzegovina. It is the only town on the Bosnia and Herzegovina coastline, making it the country's only access to the Adriatic Sea. As of 2022, Neum municipality was estimated to have had a population of 4,358 inhabitants, although Neum had a population of 4,653 in 2013, with 3,013 of those living within the town of Neum itself.

== Geography ==
Neum is the only town situated along Bosnia and Herzegovina's 20-kilometre (12 mi) coastline, making it the country's only access to the Adriatic Sea. It is enclosed by the Klek Peninsula, which itself is separated from the Adriatic Sea by the Pelješac peninsula.

Neum is 47 km (29 mi) northwest of Dubrovnik, 50 km (31 mi) south of Mostar, and 122 km (76 mi) southwest of Sarajevo, the country's capital.

The Bosnian coastal strip of Neum cuts off the southernmost Croatian exclave from the rest of Croatia. This is a result of the Treaty of Karlowitz of 1699. Since 1991 and the breakup of Yugoslavia, the border between Croatia and Bosnia and Herzegovina in the Neum region has been an international border.

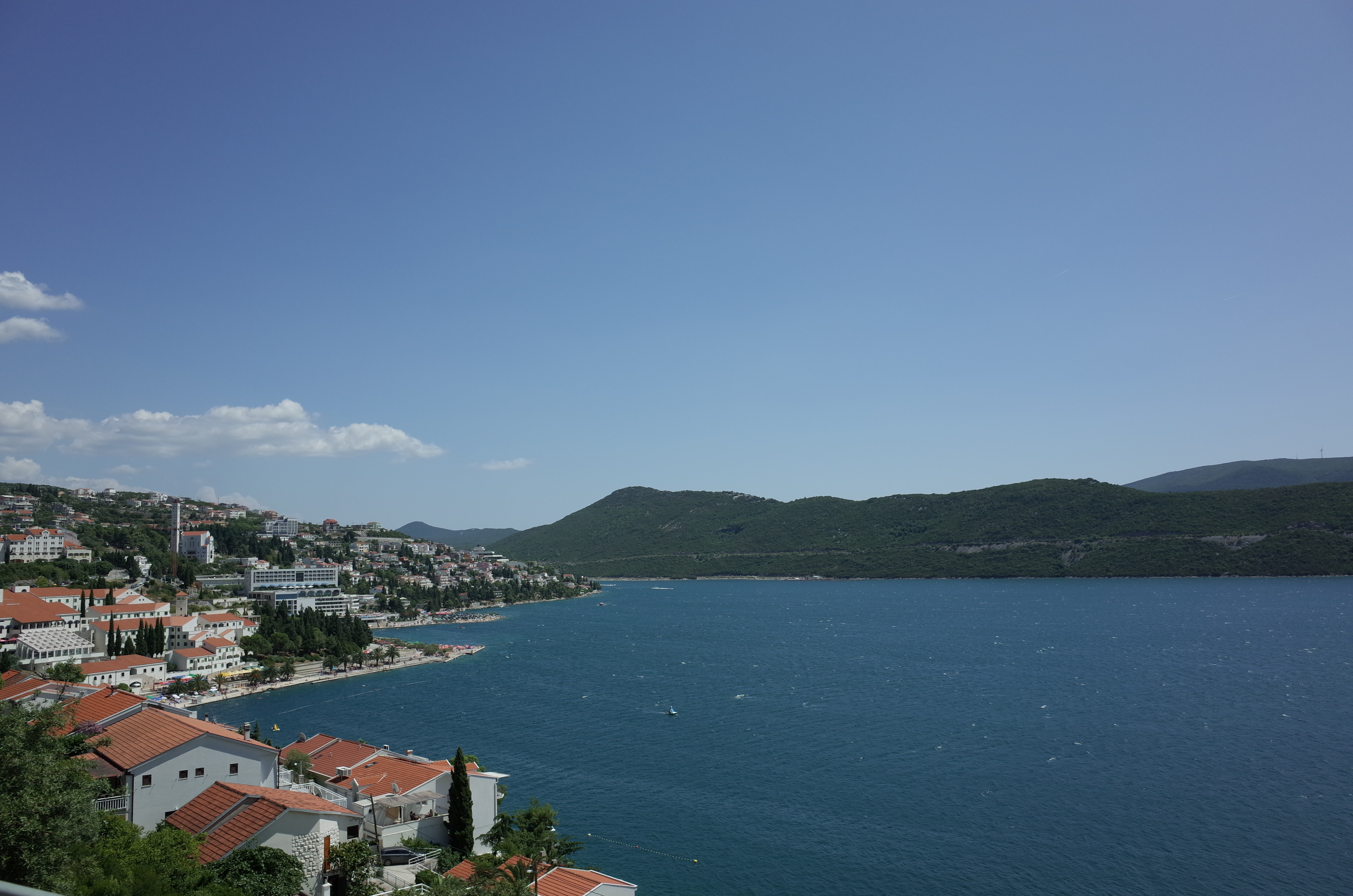
Neum

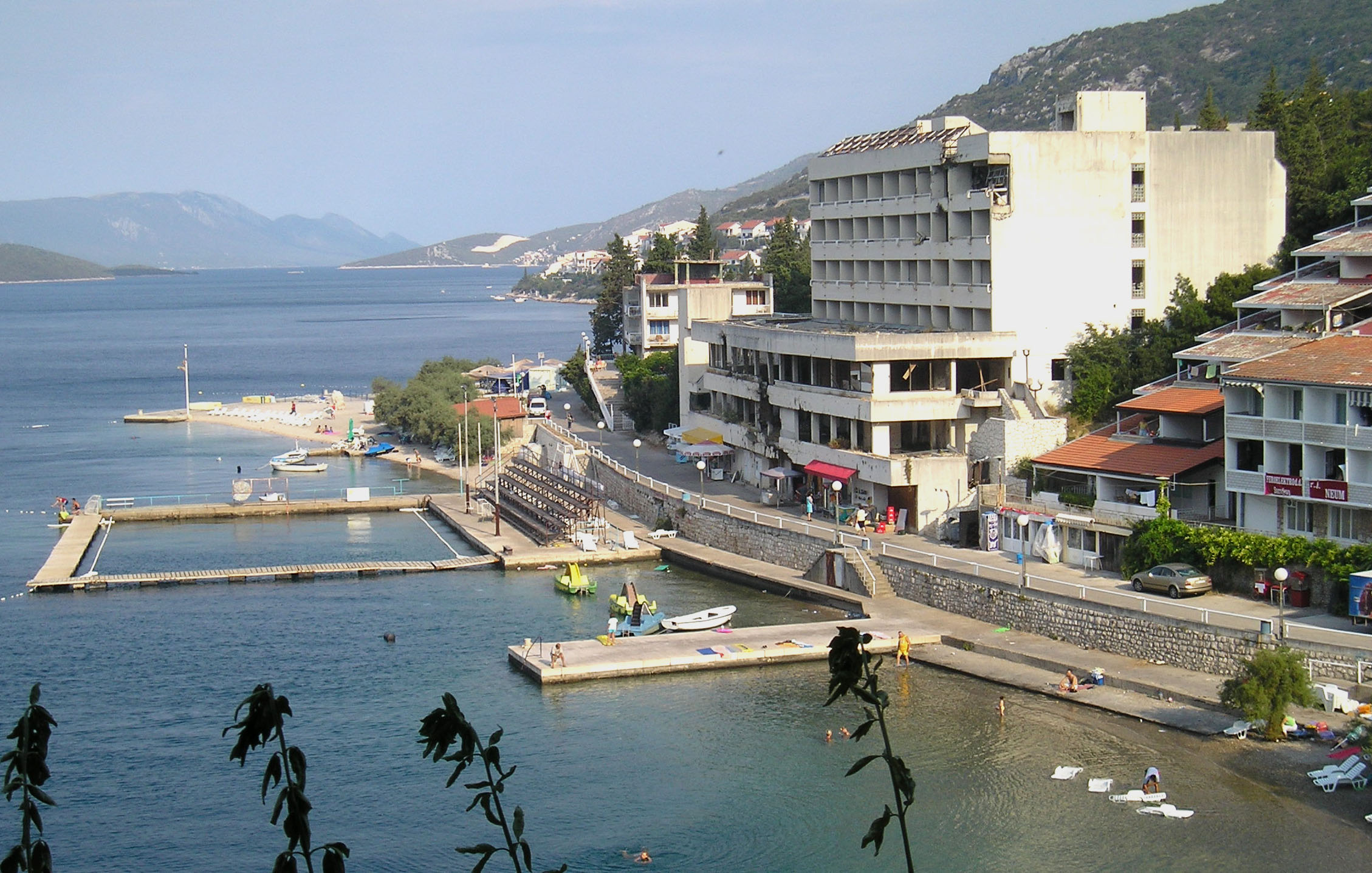
Promenade along Neum's shoreline

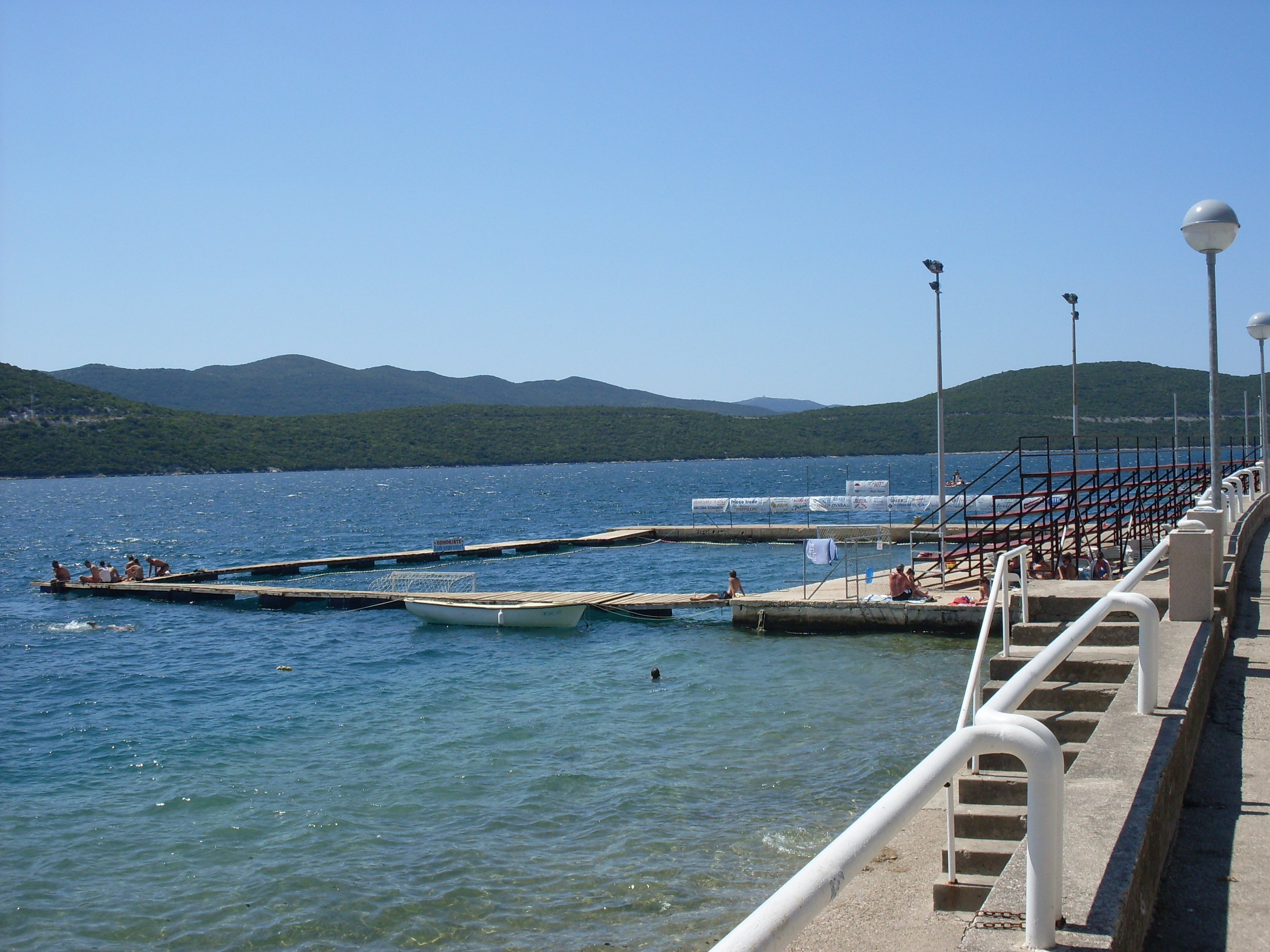
Waterpolo court in Neum

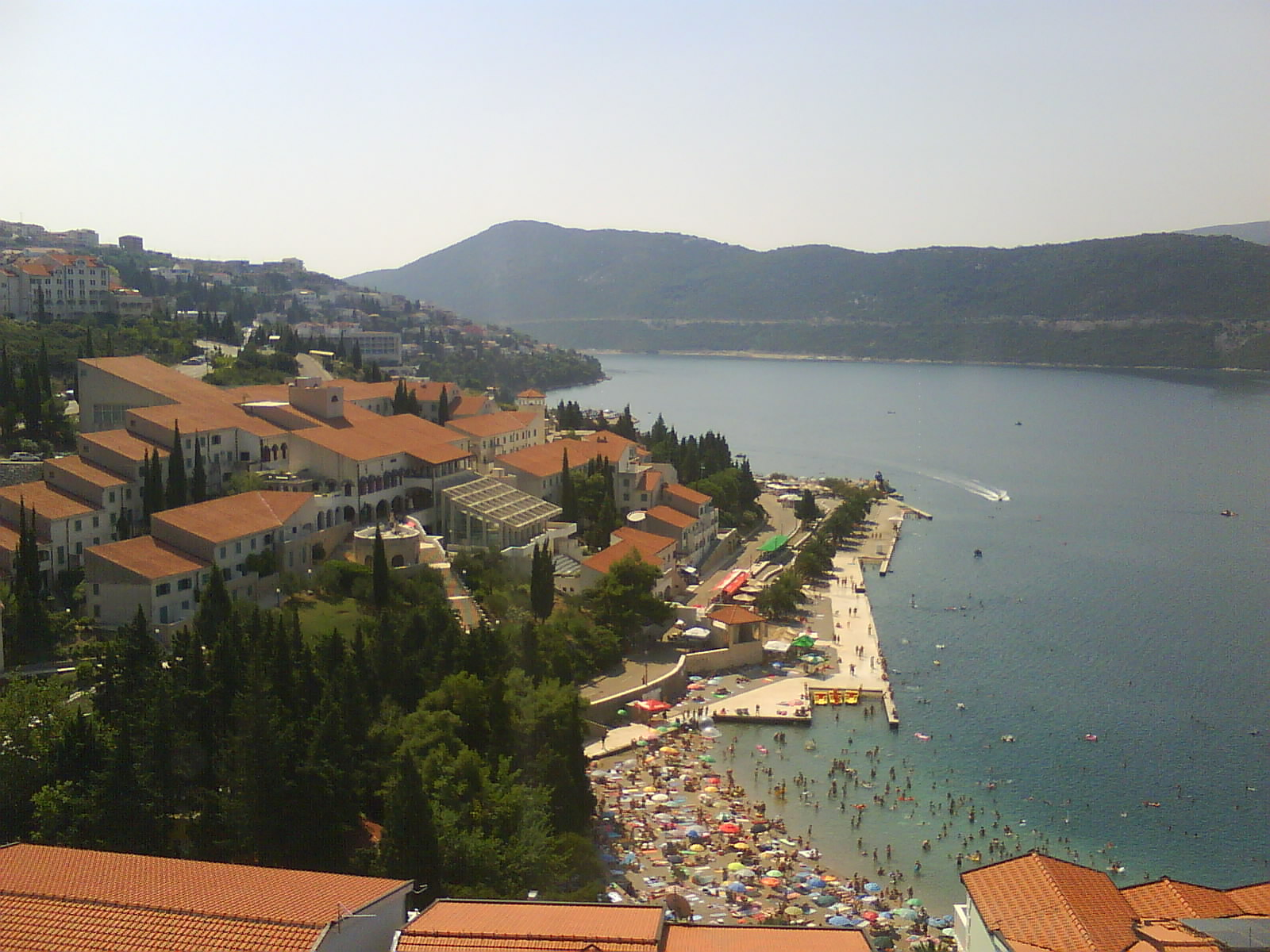
Zenička beach in Neum

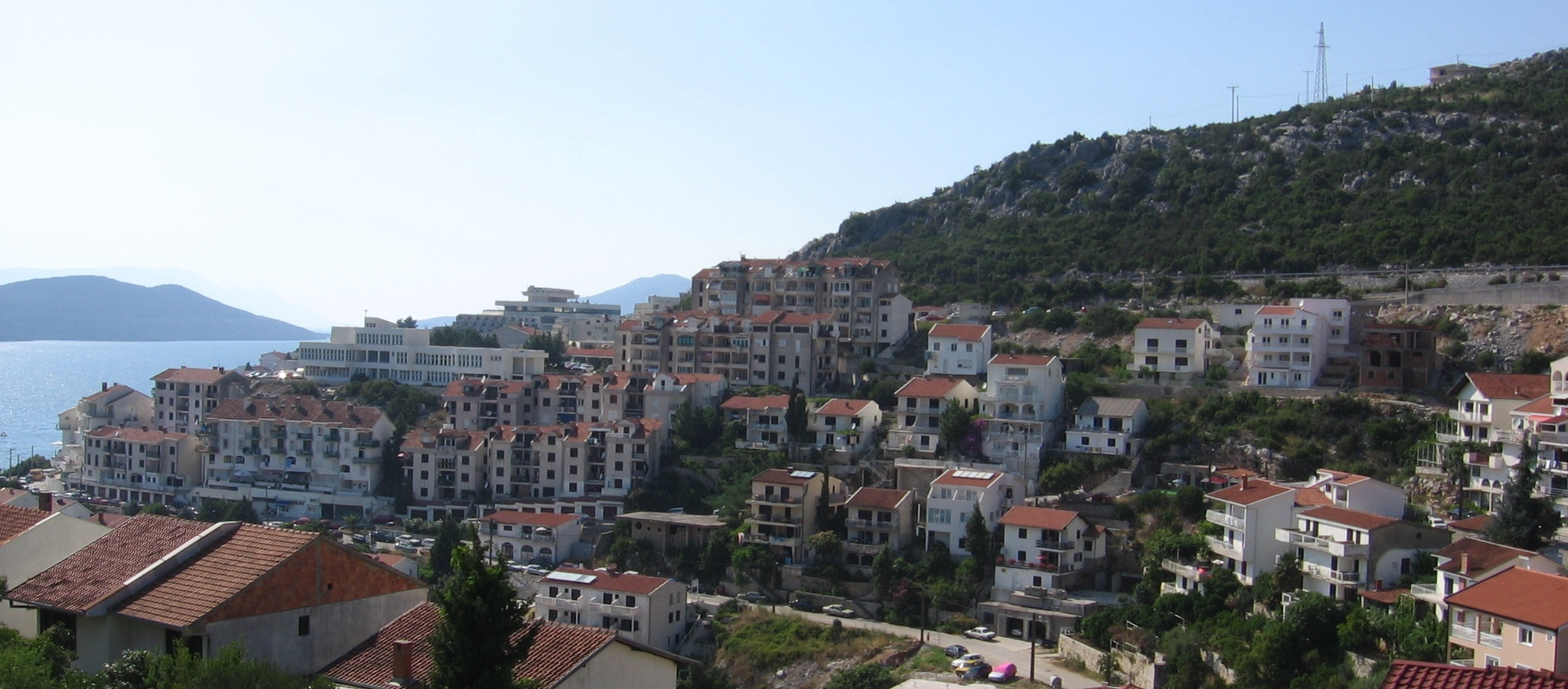
Residential Neum

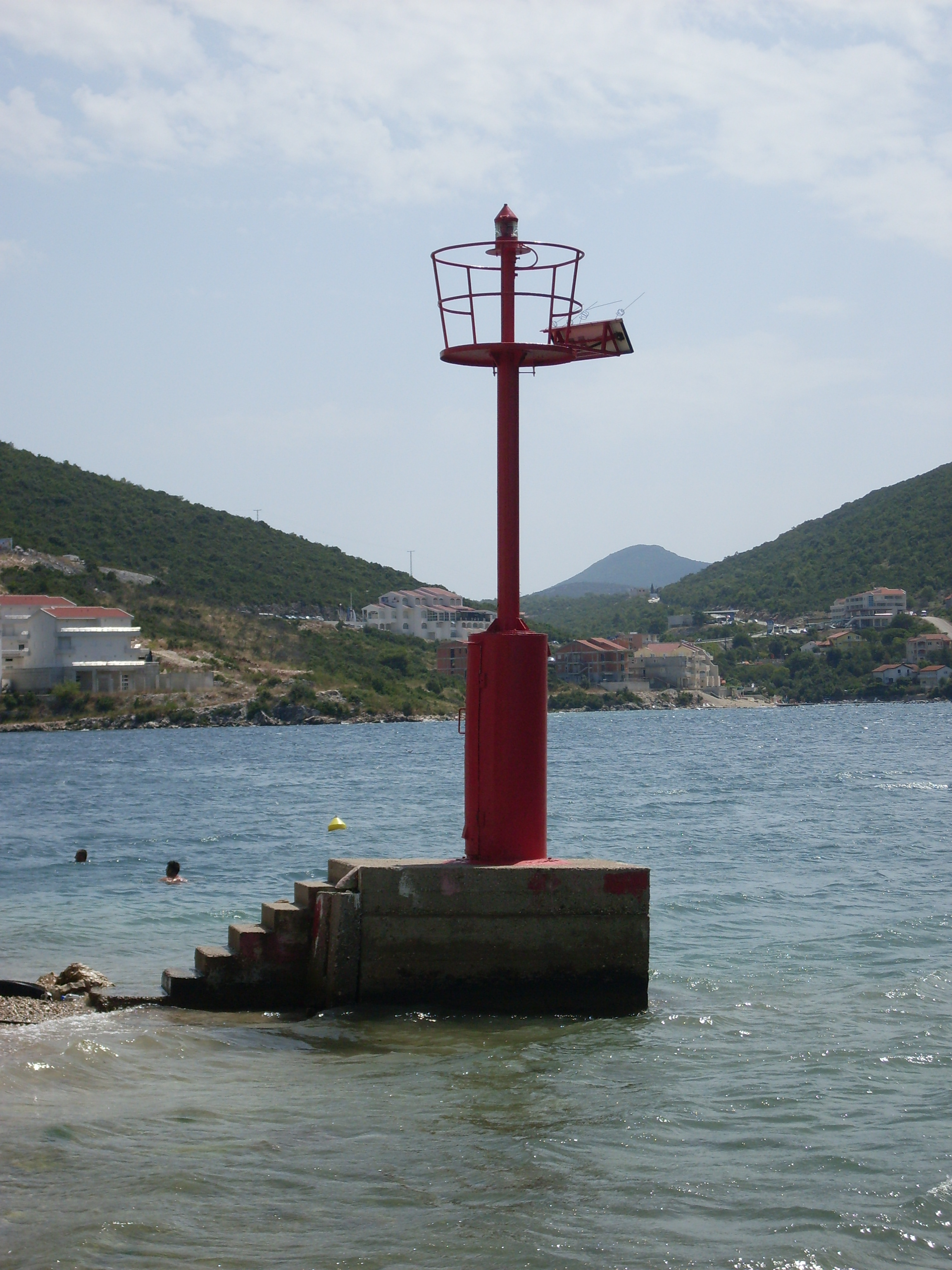
Neum Lighthouse

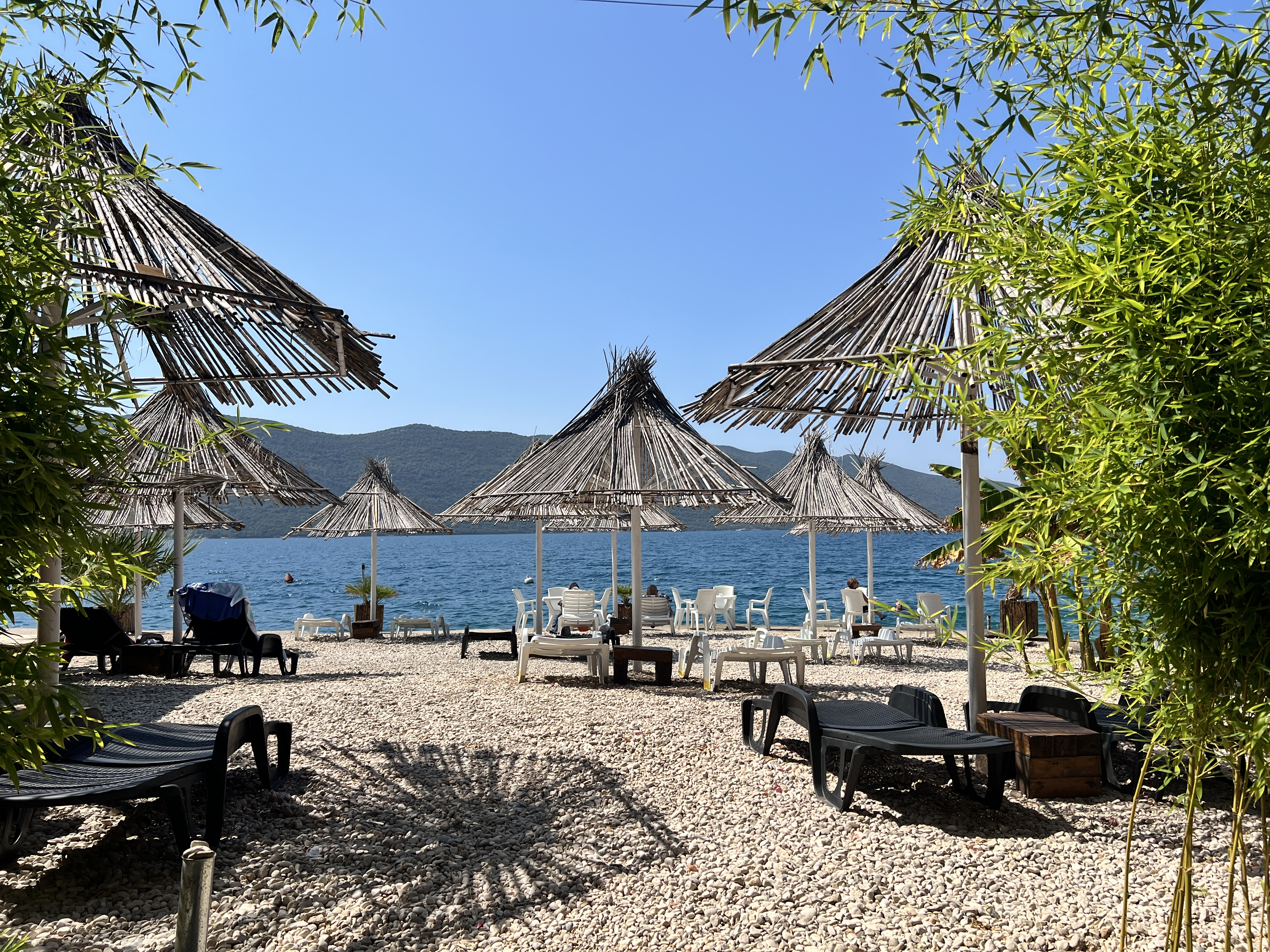
Feral Beach on the southern side of Neum peninsula

=== Subdivision ===
The municipality includes the town of Neum (municipal seat) and several villages:

Babin Do, Borut, Brestica, Broćanac, Brštanica, Cerovica, Cerovo, Crnoglav, Dobri Do, Dobrovo, Donji Drijen, Donji Zelenikovac, Dubravica, Duži, Glumina, Gornje Hrasno, Gradac, Hotanj Hutovski, Hutovo, Kiševo, Moševići, Prapratnica, Previš, Rabrani, Vinine and Žukovica.

=== Border crossings ===
Neum has two border crossing checkpoints with Croatia on the European route E65 or Adriatic Highway which connects the two parts of Croatia's Dalmatian coast. Neum 1 is located to the northwest of the city, with the Klek border checkpoint on the Croatian side. Neum 2 is located to the southeast, with the Croatian border checkpoint at Zaton Doli.

== History ==
The Neum corridor dates back to the Treaty of Karlowitz of 1699, whereby the Republic of Ragusa was separated from the Dalmatian possessions of its rival Venice by two buffer zones ceded by Ragusa to the Ottoman Empire to prevent the possibility of Venice invading via land: north of its territory is Neum and the bay of Klek, and south of its territory is Sutorina with the port of Herceg Novi on the Bay of Kotor, part of Montenegro since 1947 (later the topic of the now-resolved Sutorina dispute).

The Karlowitz borders were reaffirmed in 1718 by the Treaty of Passarowitz, but then the Ottomans, tired of negotiating in vain with Venice for a widening of their maritime access, simply usurped the territory of Gornji Klek and most of Klek from Ragusa, which it had bought from King Dabiša of Bosnia at the end of the 14th century. After the fall of the Republic of Venice in 1797, and the Congress of Vienna in 1815, the Austrian Empire, which had annexed both the Dalmatian possessions of Venice and the territory of Ragusa, tried to buy back the Neum and Sutorina enclaves from the Ottomans, but in vain. Instead, it stationed a warship to block access to the port of Neum until the Treaty of Berlin, which gave the whole of Bosnia and Herzegovina to Austria-Hungary in 1878. Neum had been under Ottoman control for 179 years.

Consideration was given to a plan to build a new advanced naval base at Neum-Klek by the Austro-Hungarian Navy. General Franz Conrad von Hötzendorf considered fortifying Neum with coastal batteries and torpedo craft to supplement seafront defenses (in order to prevent Italian raids, or worse a large scale Italian landing). The project never got past the planning stage prior to the outbreak of World War I in 1914.

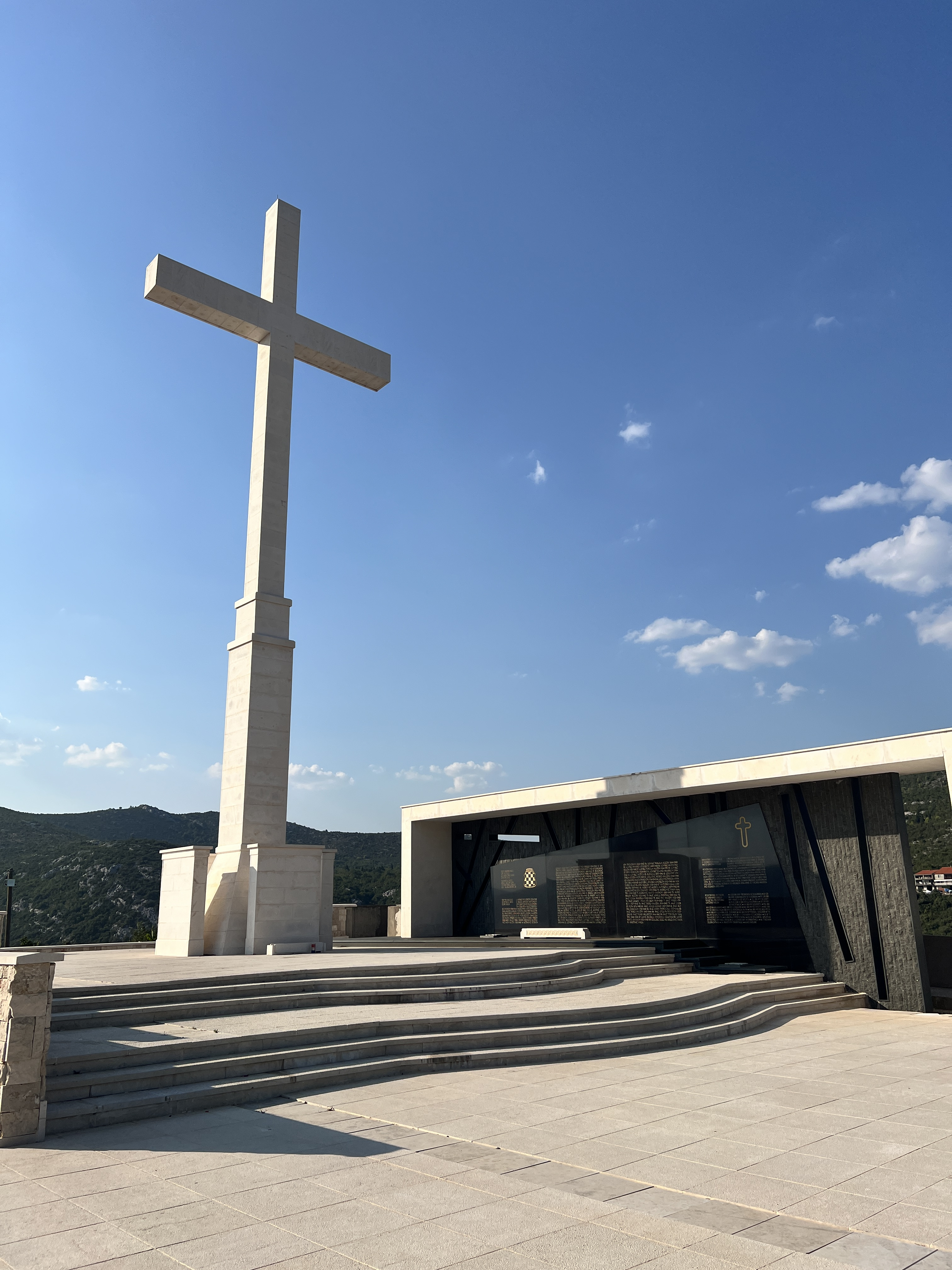
Memorial to Croatian veterans in Neum.

In 1918, as a consequence of Austro-Hungarian defeat, Neum joined the Kingdom of Serbs, Croats and Slovenes which would become the Kingdom of Yugoslavia in 1929. Under the Karađorđević dynasty, the Yugoslav Government ignored the historical borders twice: in 1929, when the Neum area was included in the Littoral Banovina, and in 1939 when, following the Cvetković–Maček Agreement, it was included in the Banovina of Croatia. Josip Broz Tito's federal Yugoslavia was founded on the principle, declared at the 1943 AVNOJ session in Jajce and comparatively well-respected by the Đilas commission in 1945, of establishing the federative republics in their borders of 1878, which is why the Neum enclave is now part of independent Bosnia and Herzegovina, including most of Klek (Ponta Kleka, Rep Kleka), the two islets Veliki and Mali Školj and the rock of Lopata in the Bay of Klek.

Since the 1990s, Croatia and Bosnia and Herzegovina have been in negotiations on how to handle traffic across the Neum region, including signing a Neum Agreement. When Croatia was admitted to the European Union in 2013, the border crossings in the Neum region became governed as external borders of the EU. The construction and opening in 2022 of the Pelješac Bridge, which bypasses Neum entirely, has significance for Croatia's integrity and also for its Schengen Area membership and the EU as a whole. It significantly improves traffic flow and the traffic connection of Dubrovnik to the rest of mainland Croatia, avoiding negotiating long, costly queues at Neum, and strict customs checks twice within the space of 20 kilometres (12 mi).

Encouraged by the recent developments in Croatia–Slovenia border disputes (June 2017), the ruling Bosniak Party of Democratic Action (SDA) and other Bosniak political parties decided to obstruct the construction.

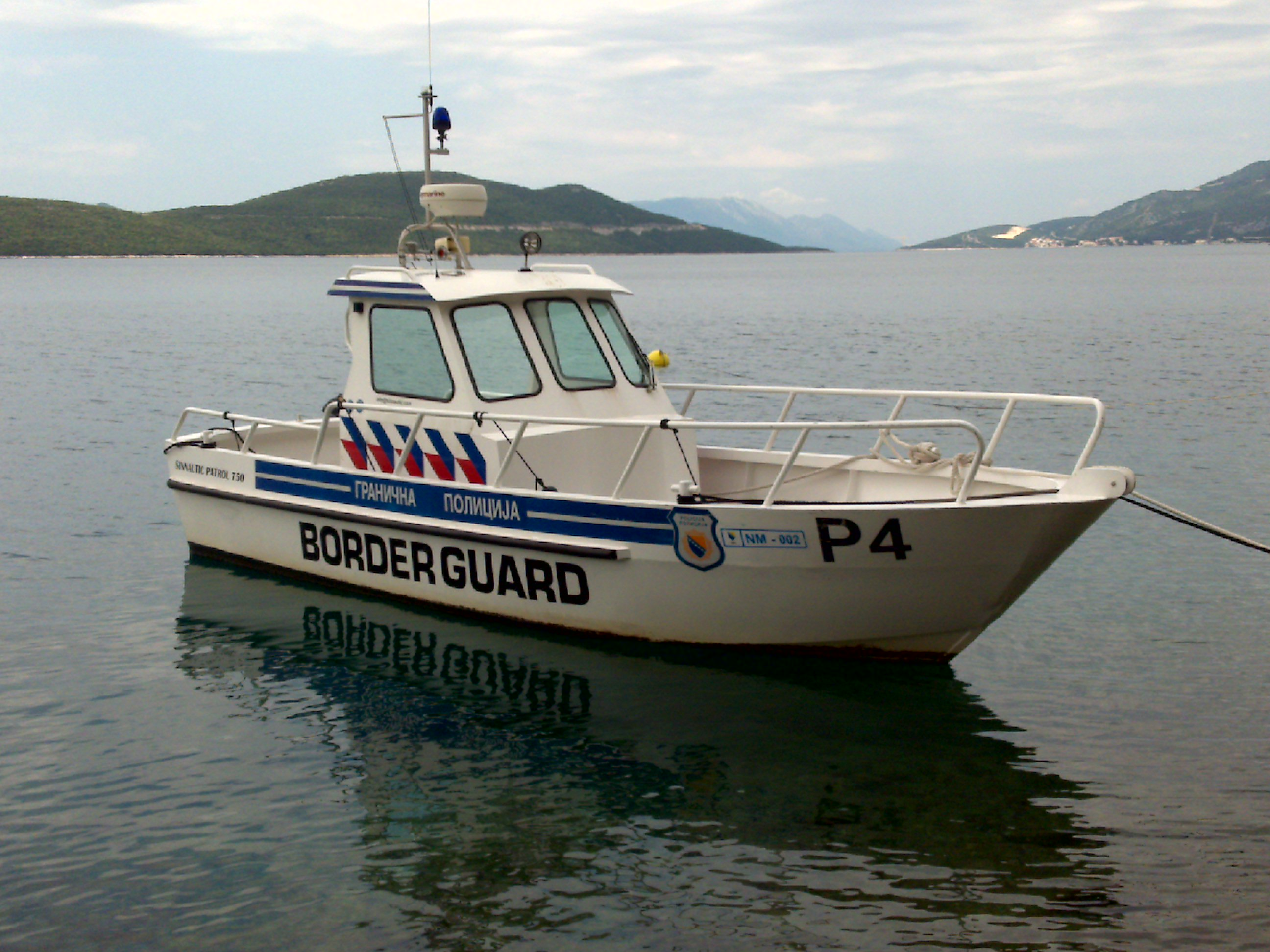
BiH coast guard / border police

The construction cost was €420 million, to which the EU contributed by allocating €357 million from Cohesion Policy funds. The bridge is among the largest infrastructures in Croatia currently and one of the most substantial EU infrastructural investment ever. The work was completed in mid 2022. The EU is also funding supporting infrastructure, such as the construction of access roads, including tunnels, bridges and viaducts, the building of an 8 km-long bypass near the town of Ston and upgrading works on the existing road D414.

There are Bosniak plans to convert Neum to a freight port, contrary to the wishes of the local population and international laws and agreements concerning the ecologically significant and protected Bay of Mali Ston, of which Bay of Neum is a part. There are plans to build a seaport, rail and a motorway and thus the Croatian bridge must have a high clearance according to the view of Bosnia and Herzegovina's Bosniak political parties. Due to the above, the Republic of Croatia has significantly increased the height of the bridge by adapting it to ships whose dimensions cannot enter the Bay of Neum at all. Today the main freight port for Bosnia and Herzegovina is Ploče (in Croatia) farther north, which has a railway to Bosnia and Herzegovina.

== Climate ==
Neum has a borderline humid subtropical climate (Köppen climate classification: Cfa) and hot-summer mediterranean climate (Köppen climate classification: Csa), because only one summer month has a mean precipitation not exceeding 40 mm (1.6 in) and summer receives significant precipitation, despite the Mediterranean precipitation pattern. As a typical feature of the Mediterranean precipitation pattern, the mean precipitation in winter is three times higher than the mean precipitation in summer. The mean yearly precipitation observed is of 1,316 mm (51.8 in). The dominant winds come from the north, north-east and north-west. The average sea temperature (as observed in Neum) ranges from 13 °C (55 °F) in January to 28 °C (82 °F) in July and August.

The natural vegetation is evergreen Mediterranean flora, and subtropical flora (palm trees, agaves, cacti) grow in Neum and its surroundings.

Climate data for Neum
| Month | Jan | Feb | Mar | Apr | May | Jun | Jul | Aug | Sep | Oct | Nov | Dec | Year |
|---|---|---|---|---|---|---|---|---|---|---|---|---|---|
| Mean daily maximum °C (°F) | 9.7 (49.5) | 11.3 (52.3) | 14.3 (57.7) | 17.5 (63.5) | 22.5 (72.5) | 26.2 (79.2) | 29.7 (85.5) | 29.4 (84.9) | 25.9 (78.6) | 20.6 (69.1) | 14.8 (58.6) | 11.2 (52.2) | 19.4 (67.0) |
| Daily mean °C (°F) | 6.6 (43.9) | 7.9 (46.2) | 10.2 (50.4) | 13.0 (55.4) | 17.6 (63.7) | 21.2 (70.2) | 24.4 (75.9) | 24.2 (75.6) | 20.9 (69.6) | 16.3 (61.3) | 11.4 (52.5) | 8.2 (46.8) | 15.2 (59.4) |
| Mean daily minimum °C (°F) | 3.6 (38.5) | 4.5 (40.1) | 6.1 (43.0) | 8.6 (47.5) | 12.7 (54.9) | 16.3 (61.3) | 19.2 (66.6) | 19.0 (66.2) | 16.0 (60.8) | 12.1 (53.8) | 8.0 (46.4) | 5.2 (41.4) | 10.9 (51.7) |
| Average precipitation mm (inches) | 135 (5.3) | 123 (4.8) | 106 (4.2) | 100 (3.9) | 75 (3.0) | 59 (2.3) | 38 (1.5) | 52 (2.0) | 88 (3.5) | 127 (5.0) | 174 (6.9) | 172 (6.8) | 1,249 (49.2) |

== Ethnic composition ==
The settlement is predominantly composed of Croats. Bosniaks are the second-largest demographic, followed by Serbs. Other ethnicities include Albanians, Montenegrins and Yugoslavs.

Ethnic composition – Neum town
| | 2013. | 1991. | 1981. | 1971. |
| Total | 3,013 (100%) | 1,651 (100%) | 602 (100%) | 360 (100%) |
| Croats | 2,938 (97.51%) | 1,338 (81.04%) | 499 (82.89%) | 335 (93.06%) |
| Bosniaks | 33 (1.161%) | 89 (5.391%) | 17 (2.824%) | 3 (0.833%) |
| Serbs | 21 (0.697%) | 98 (5.936%) | 25 (4.153%) | 10 (2.778%) |
| Unaffiliated | 6 (0.199%) | | | |
| Albanians | 3 (0.1%) | | 4 (0.664%) | |
| Unknown | 3 (0.1%) | | | |
| Others | 3 (0.100%) | 36 (2.180%) | 3 (0.498%) | 5 (1.389%) |
| Yugoslavs | 2 (0.066%) | 90 (5.451%) | 47 (7.807%) | 7 (1.944%) |
| Montenegrins | 2 (0.066%) | | 6 (0.997%) | |
| Macedonians | | | 1 (0.166%) | |

Ethnic composition – Neum municipality
| | 2013. | 1991. | 1981. |
| Total | 4,960 (100%) | 4,325 (100%) | 4,030 (100%) |
| Croats | 4,543 (97.64%) | 3,792 (87.68%) | 3,575 (88.71%) |
| Bosniaks | 63 (1.397%) | 190 (4.393%) | 157 (3.896%) |
| Serbs | 21 (0.451%) | 207 (4.786%) | 179 (4.442%) |
| Unaffiliated | 7 (0.15%) | | |
| Unknown | 7 (0.15%) | | |
| Albanians | 3 (0.064%) | | 5 (0.124%) |
| Others | 3 (0.064%) | 46 (1.064%) | 17 (0.422%) |
| Yugoslavs | 2 (0.043%) | 90 (2.081%) | 89 (2.208%) |
| Montenegrins | 2 (0.043%) | | 7 (0.174%) |
| Macedonians | | | 1 (0.025%) |

== Culture and sport ==
The linđo is traditionally danced in the Neum region. Neum celebrates the feast of Our Lady of Good Health as its municipal day. As part of the celebrations, Neum hosts the Music Festival Etnofest Neum. The town also hosts the Neum Animated Film Festival.

Neum is home to local branches of the cultural organizations Matica hrvatska and HKD Napredak.

Popular activities include swimming, sun bathing, beach-going, boating, and various other water-sports. Neum has a water polo club VK Jadran Neum, which is a member of the Croatian Water Polo Federation.

There is also an association football club HNK Neum.

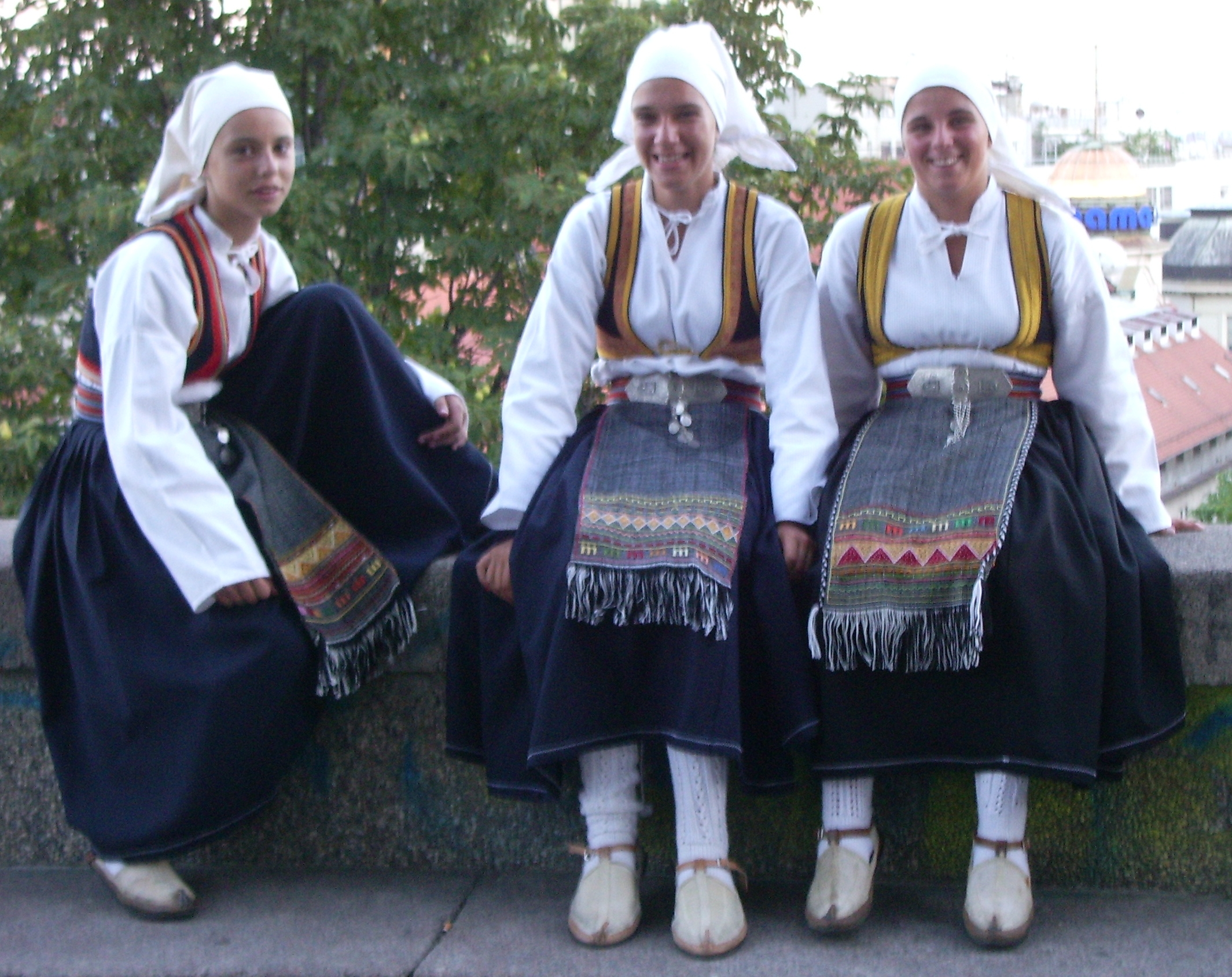
Folk costumes from Neum

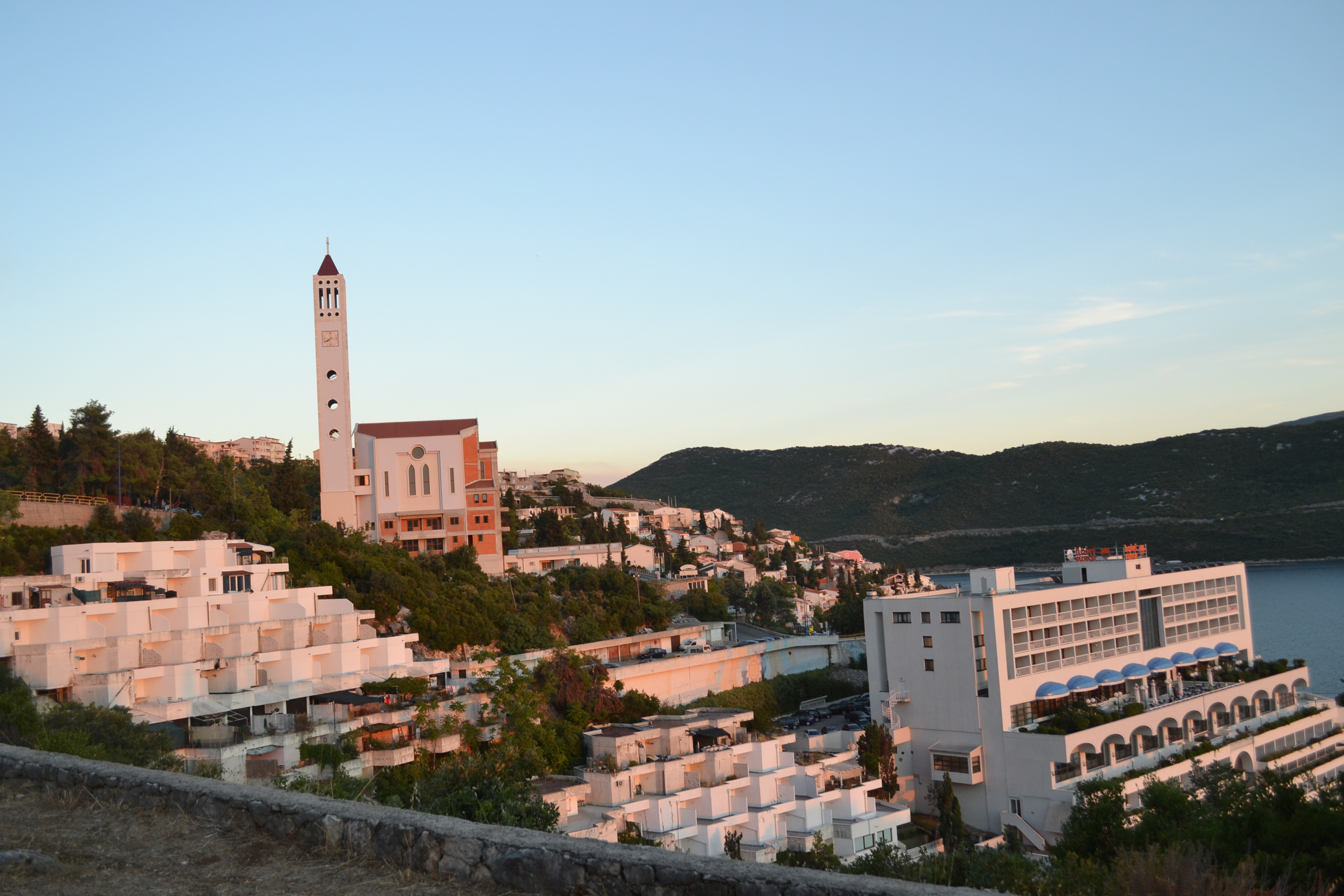
Roman Catholic church in Neum

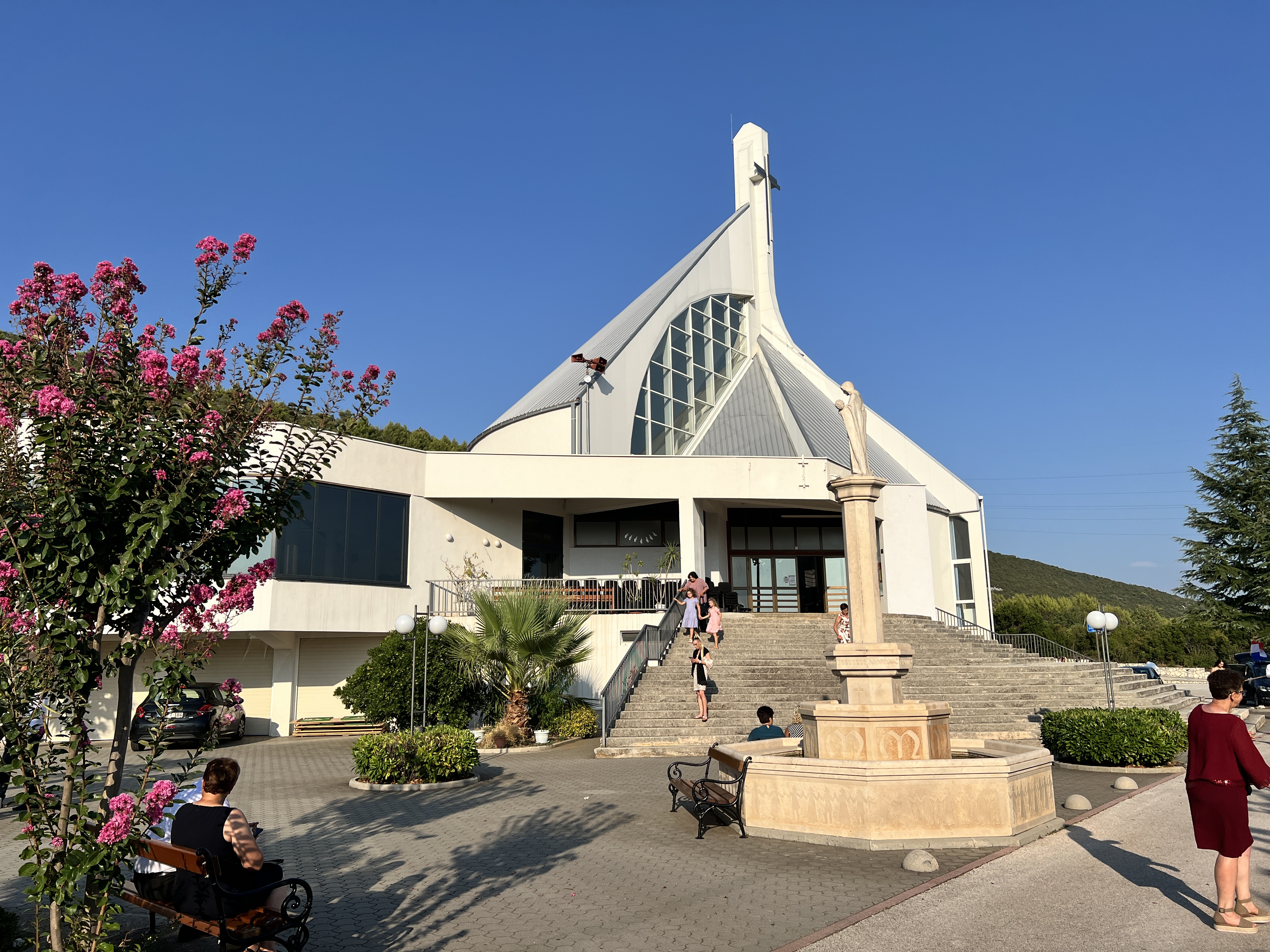
Roman Catholic Church of Our Lady of Health

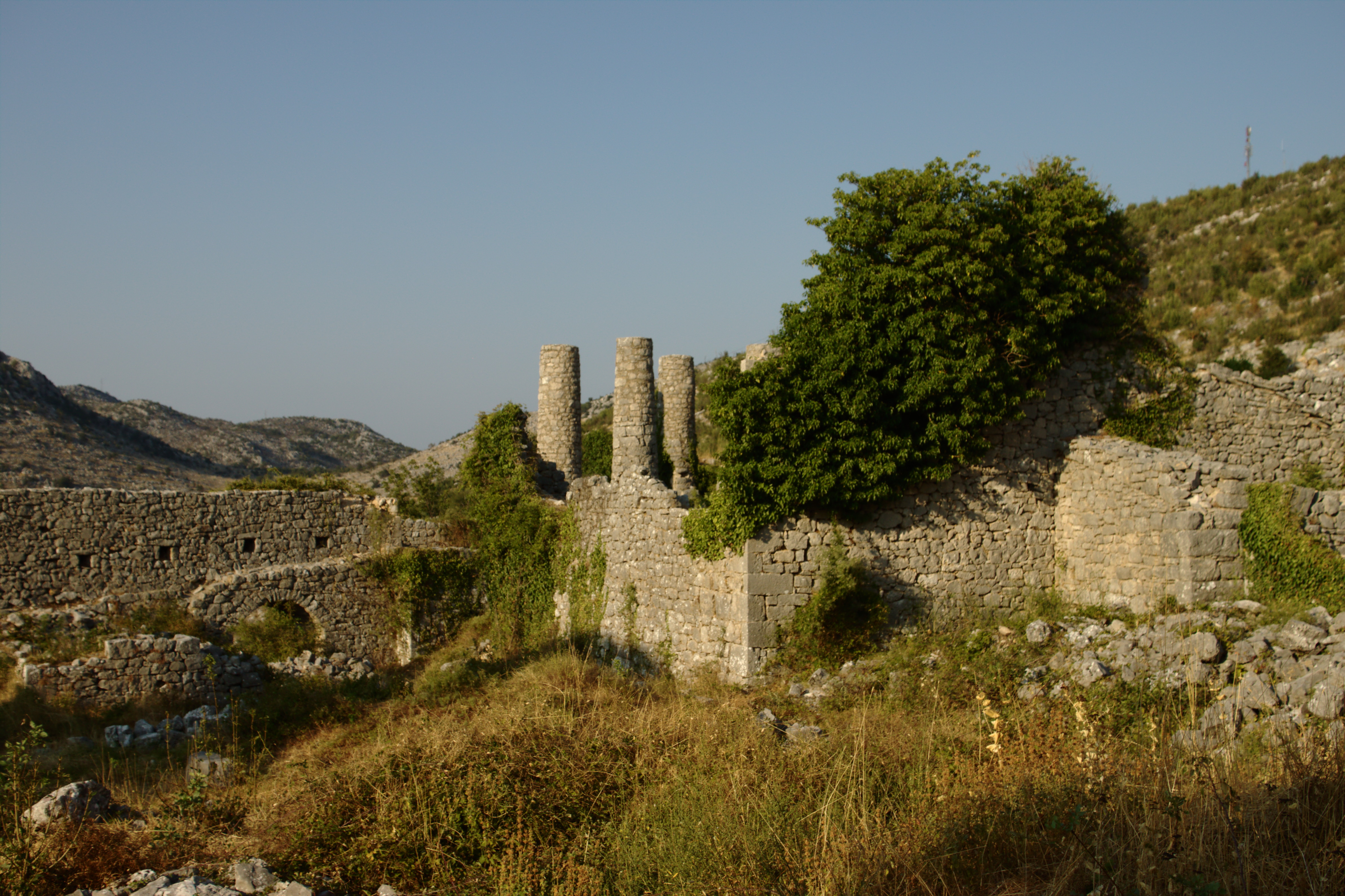
Hutovo fortress ruins

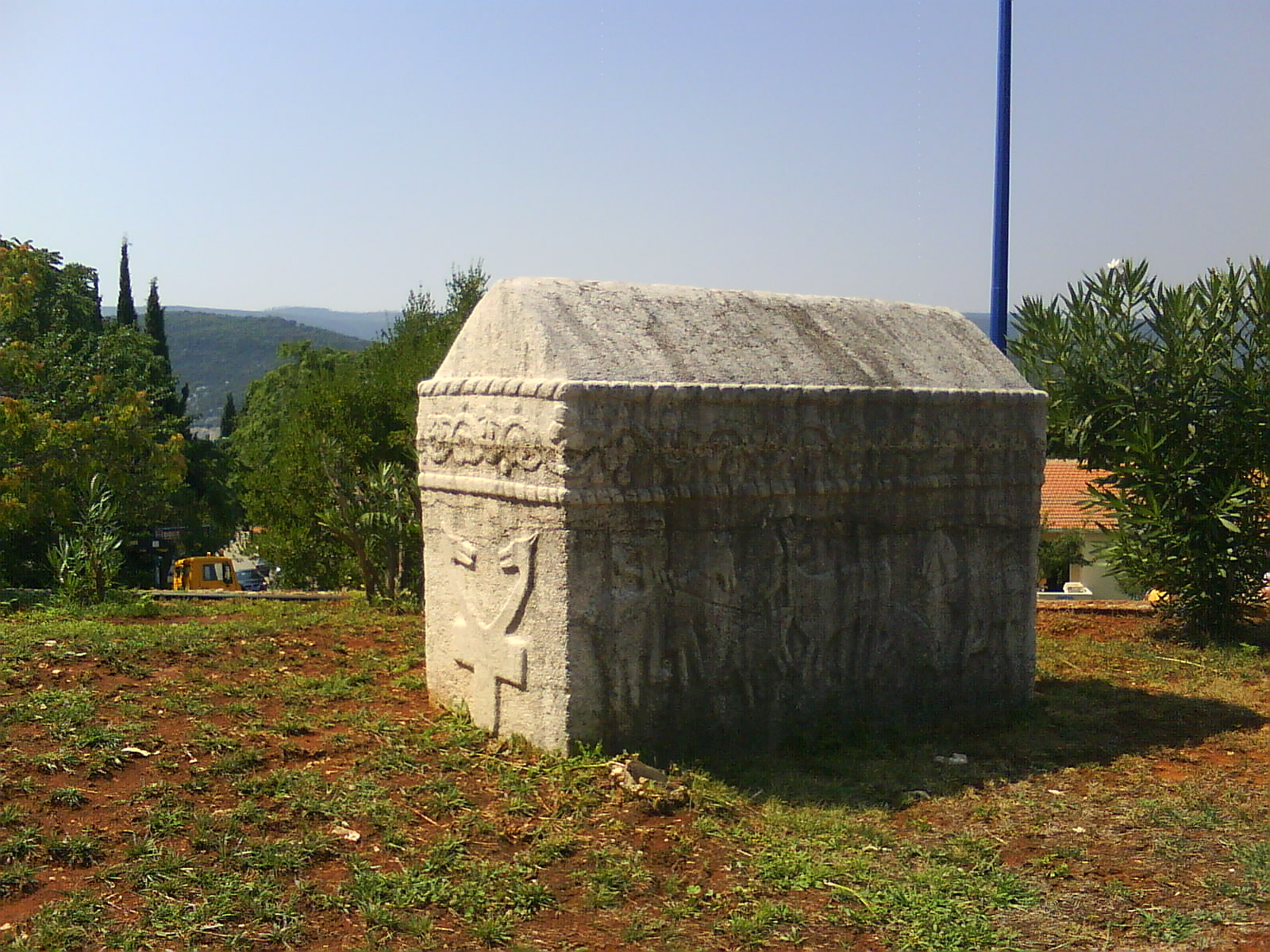
Stećak from Neum

== Tourism ==
Neum has steep hills, stone-sandy beaches, and several large tourist hotels. Neum has about 7,000 beds for tourists, 1,810 in hotels with the remaining capacity in motels, villas, and private accommodation. Tourism in Neum is active only in the coastal region. Prices tend to be lower than in neighbouring Croatia, making it popular with shoppers. Tourism, and the commerce it brings, is the leading contributor to the economy of the area.

The inland area behind Neum has a rich archeological history and wilderness with centuries-old olive groves.

== See also ==
- Bosnia and Herzegovina–Croatia relations
- List of lighthouses in Bosnia and Herzegovina
- Pelješac Bridge
