= Brštanica =

- Village
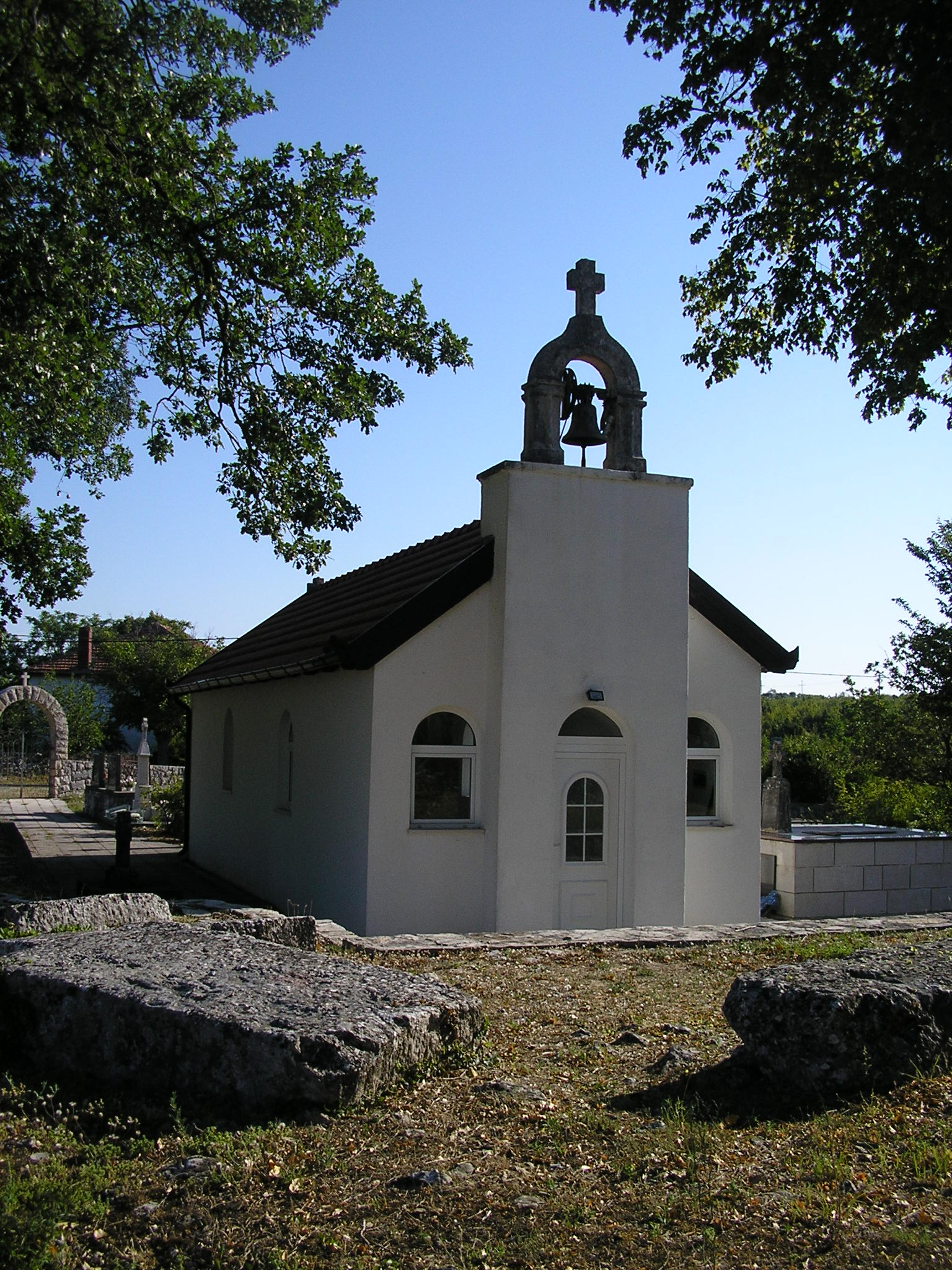
- St. Anthony of Padua church

- Location within Bosnia and Herzegovina
- Coordinates: 42.996886°N 17.7724608°E
- Country: Bosnia and Herzegovina
- Entity: Federation of Bosnia and Herzegovina
- Canton: Herzegovina-Neretva
- Municipality: Neum

Area
  - Total: 5.49 sq mi (14.23 km^{2})

Population (2013)
  - Total: 65
  - Density: 12/sq mi (4.6/km^{2})
- Time zone: UTC+1 (CET)
  - Summer (DST): UTC+2 (CEST)

Brštanica is a village in the municipality of Neum, Bosnia and Herzegovina.

== Demographics ==
According to the 2013 census, its population was 65, all Croats.
