= Cerovo, Neum =

Cerovo
- Village
- Location within Bosnia and Herzegovina
- Coordinates: 42.9943°N 17.7319°E
- Country: Bosnia and Herzegovina
- Entity: Federation of Bosnia and Herzegovina
- Canton: Herzegovina-Neretva
- Municipality: Neum

Area
  - Total: 2.26 sq mi (5.86 km^{2})

Population (2013)
  - Total: 30
  - Density: 13/sq mi (5.1/km^{2})
- Time zone: UTC+1 (CET)
  - Summer (DST): UTC+2 (CEST)

Cerovo is a village in the municipality of Neum, Bosnia and Herzegovina.

== Demographics ==
According to the 2013 census, its population was 30, all Croats.
