= Babin Do, Neum =

Babin Do
- Village
- Location within Bosnia and Herzegovina
- Coordinates: 42.9490564°N 17.6685175°E
- Country: Bosnia and Herzegovina
- Entity: Federation of Bosnia and Herzegovina
- Canton: Herzegovina-Neretva
- Municipality: Neum

Area
  - Total: 1.17 sq mi (3.02 km^{2})

Population (2013)
  - Total: 66
  - Density: 57/sq mi (22/km^{2})
- Time zone: UTC+1 (CET)
  - Summer (DST): UTC+2 (CEST)

Babin Do is a village in the municipality of Neum, Bosnia and Herzegovina.

== Demographics ==
According to the 2013 census, its population was 66, all Croats.
