= Žukovica =

- Village
- Location within Bosnia and Herzegovina
- Coordinates: 42.9243187°N 17.7578993°E
- Country: Bosnia and Herzegovina
- Entity: Federation of Bosnia and Herzegovina
- Canton: Herzegovina-Neretva
- Municipality: Neum

Area
  - Total: 1.95 sq mi (5.05 km^{2})

Population (2013)
  - Total: 27
  - Density: 14/sq mi (5.3/km^{2})
- Time zone: UTC+1 (CET)
  - Summer (DST): UTC+2 (CEST)

Žukovica is a village in the municipality of Neum, Bosnia and Herzegovina.

== Demographics ==
According to the 2013 census, its population was 27, all Croats.
