= Kiševo =

- Village
- Location within Bosnia and Herzegovina
- Coordinates: 42°56′5″N 17°39′51″E
- Country: Bosnia and Herzegovina
- Entity: Federation of Bosnia and Herzegovina
- Canton: Herzegovina-Neretva
- Municipality: Neum

Area
  - Total: 0.72 sq mi (1.87 km^{2})

Population (2013)
  - Total: 12
  - Density: 17/sq mi (6.4/km^{2})
- Time zone: UTC+1 (CET)
  - Summer (DST): UTC+2 (CEST)

Kiševo is a village in the municipality of Neum, Bosnia and Herzegovina.

== Demographics ==
According to the 2013 census, its population was 12, all Croats.
