= Broćanac, Neum =

Broćanac
- Village
- Location within Bosnia and Herzegovina
- Coordinates: 42.9531377°N 17.7419072°E
- Country: Bosnia and Herzegovina
- Entity: Federation of Bosnia and Herzegovina
- Canton: Herzegovina-Neretva
- Municipality: Neum

Area
  - Total: 2.10 sq mi (5.43 km^{2})

Population (2013)
  - Total: 74
  - Density: 35/sq mi (14/km^{2})
- Time zone: UTC+1 (CET)
  - Summer (DST): UTC+2 (CEST)

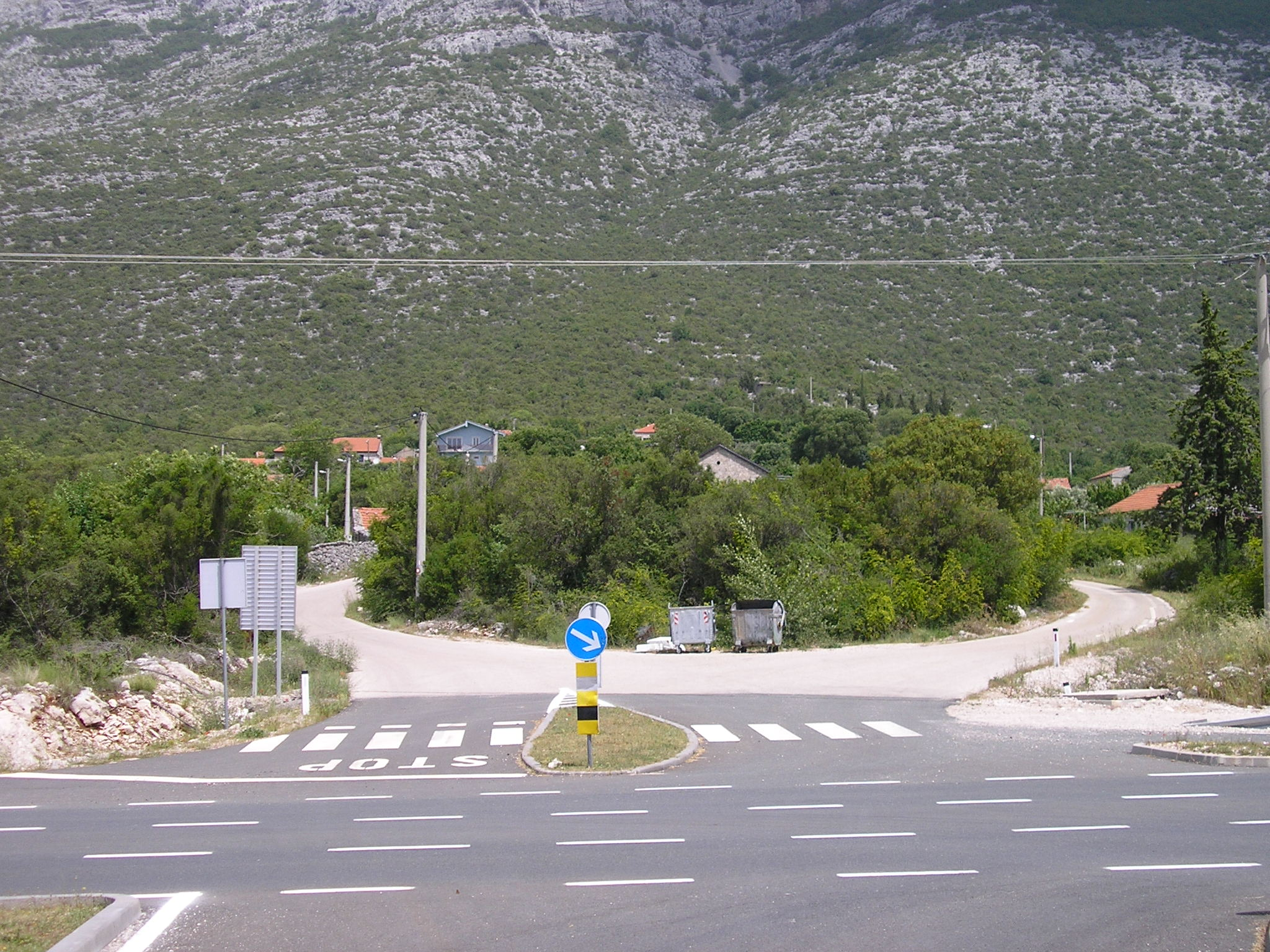

Broćanac is a village in the municipality of Neum, Bosnia and Herzegovina.

== Demographics ==
According to the 2013 census, its population was 74.

Ethnicity in 2013
Ethnicity	Number	Percentage
Croats	73	98.6%
other/undeclared	1	1.4%
Total	74	100%
