= Moševići, Neum =

Moševići
- Village
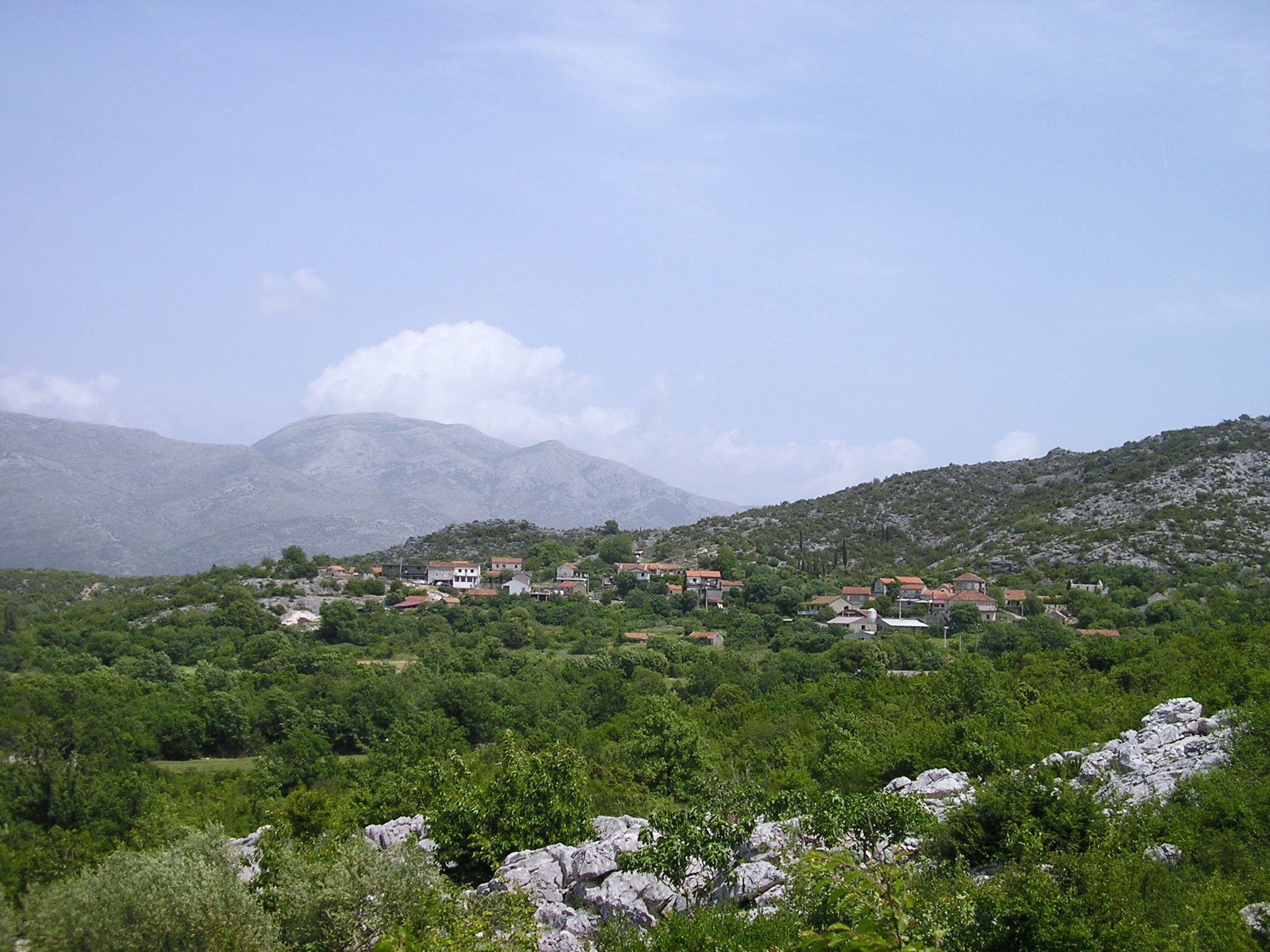

- Location within Bosnia and Herzegovina
- Coordinates: 42°56′0″N 17°42′3″E
- Country: Bosnia and Herzegovina
- Entity: Federation of Bosnia and Herzegovina
- Canton: Herzegovina-Neretva
- Municipality: Neum

Area
  - Total: 2.78 sq mi (7.21 km^{2})

Population (2013)
  - Total: 83
  - Density: 30/sq mi (12/km^{2})
- Time zone: UTC+1 (CET)
  - Summer (DST): UTC+2 (CEST)

Moševići is a village in the municipality of Neum, Bosnia and Herzegovina.

== Demographics ==
According to the 2013 census, its population was 83, all Croats.
