= Duži, Trebinje =

Duži Дужи
- Village
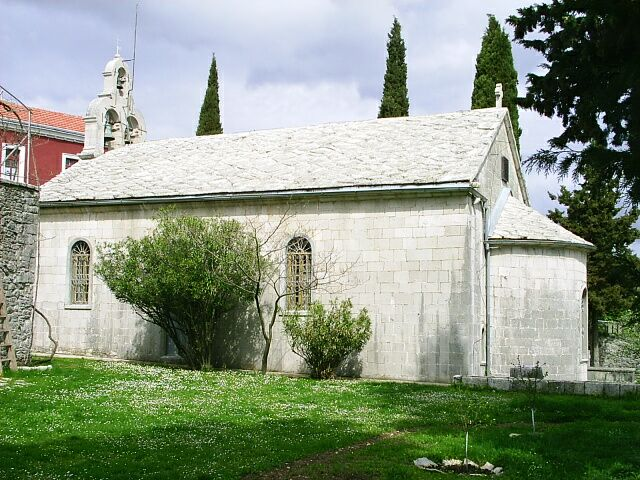
- Duži orthodox monastery near Trebinje

- Location within Bosnia and Herzegovina
- Coordinates: 42°41′55″N 18°15′45″E
- Country: Bosnia and Herzegovina
- Entity: Republika Srpska
- Municipality: Trebinje
- Time zone: UTC+1 (CET)
  - Summer (DST): UTC+2 (CEST)

Duži (Serbian Cyrillic: Дужи) is a village in the municipality of Trebinje, Republika Srpska, Bosnia and Herzegovina.

== See also ==
- Duži Monastery
