= Broćanac, Posušje =

Broćanac
- Village
- Location within Bosnia and Herzegovina
- Coordinates: 43°28′08″N 17°24′23″E
- Country: Bosnia and Herzegovina
- Entity: Federation of Bosnia and Herzegovina
- Canton: West Herzegovina Canton
- Municipality: Posušje

Area
  - Total: 31.37 km^{2} (12.11 sq mi)

Population (2013)
  - Total: 1,209
  - Density: 38.54/km^{2} (99.82/sq mi)
- Time zone: UTC+1 (CET)
  - Summer (DST): UTC+2 (CEST)

Broćanac is a village in the municipality of Posušje in West Herzegovina Canton, the Federation of Bosnia and Herzegovina, Bosnia and Herzegovina.

== Demographics ==
According to the 2013 census, its population was 1,209.

Ethnicity in 2013
Ethnicity	Number	Percentage
Croats	1,208	99.9%
other/undeclared	1	0.1%
Total	1,209	100%

== Bibliography ==
- Ethnicity/National Affiliation, Religion and Mother Tongue (PDF). Sarajevo: Agency for Statistics of Bosnia and Herzegovina. 2019.
