= Duži, Neum =

Duži
- Village
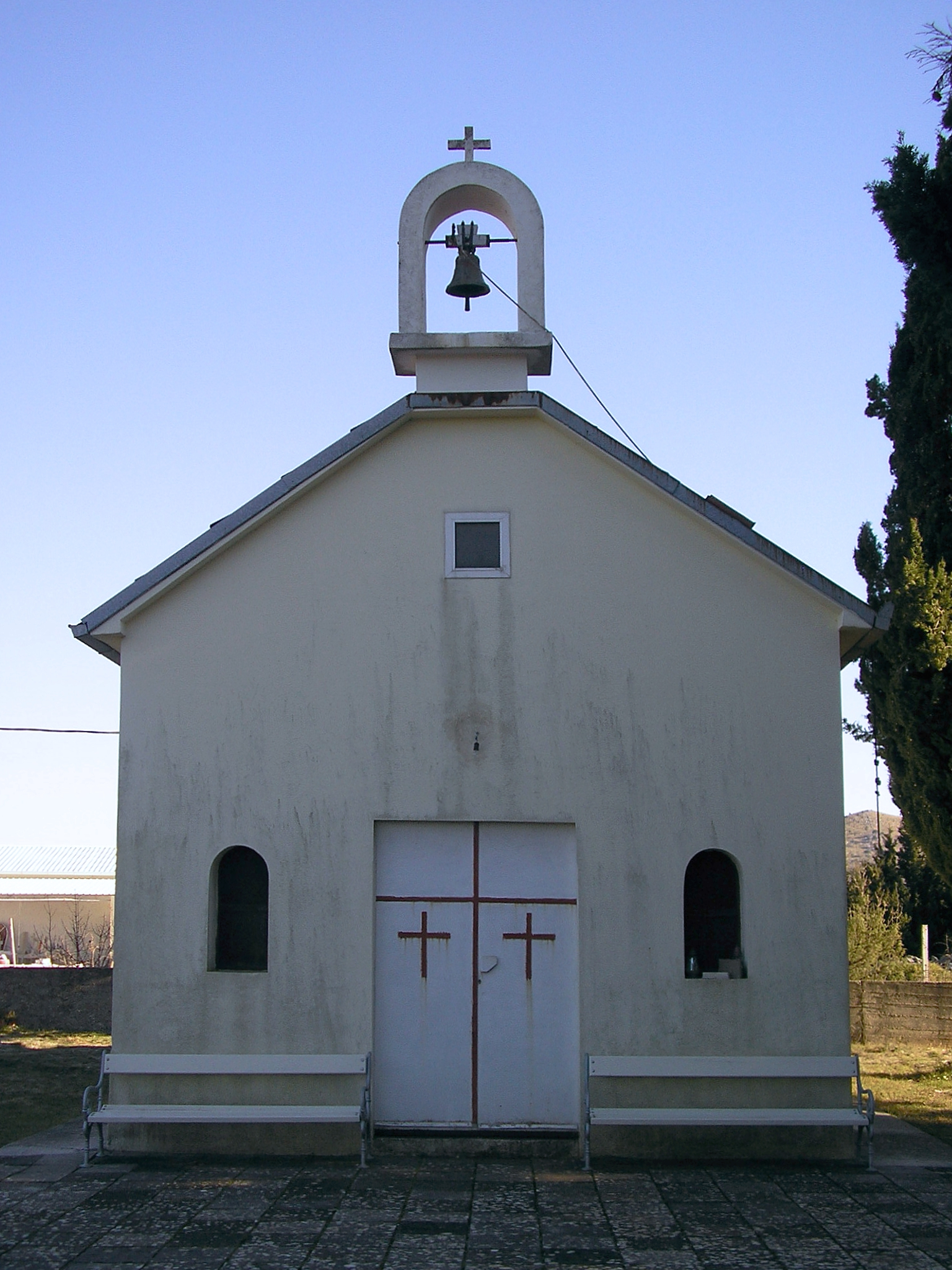

- Location within Bosnia and Herzegovina
- Coordinates: 42.9169339°N 17.6615566°E
- Country: Bosnia and Herzegovina
- Entity: Federation of Bosnia and Herzegovina
- Canton: Herzegovina-Neretva
- Municipality: Neum

Area
  - Total: 1.29 sq mi (3.33 km^{2})

Population (2013)
  - Total: 42
  - Density: 33/sq mi (13/km^{2})
- Time zone: UTC+1 (CET)
  - Summer (DST): UTC+2 (CEST)

Duži is a village in the municipality of Neum, Bosnia and Herzegovina.

== Demographics ==
According to the 2013 census, its population was 42, all Croats.
