= Duži Monastery =

Serbian Orthodox monastery near Trebinje, Bosnia and Herzegovina

Coordinates: 42.706226°N 18.261981°E

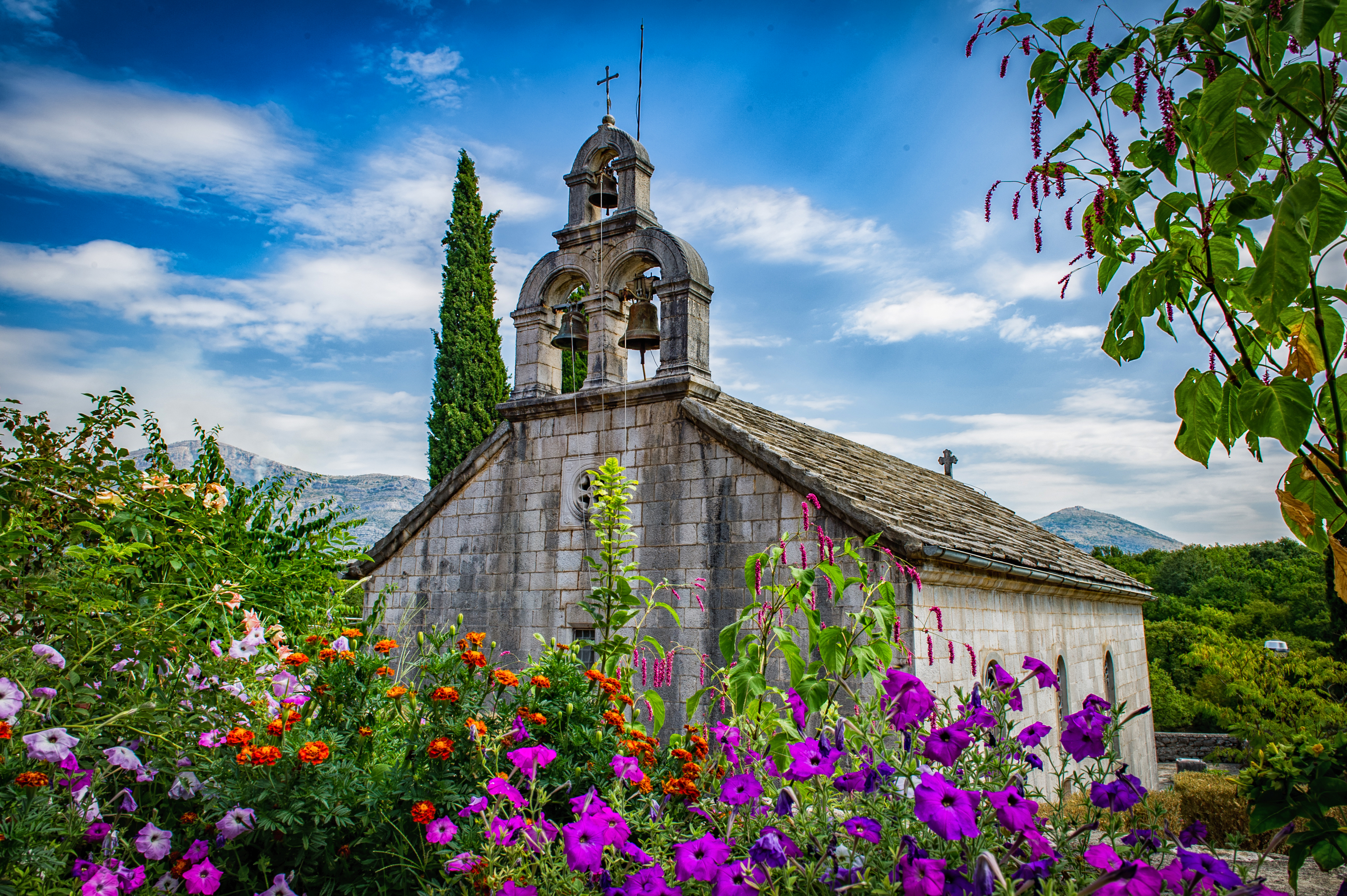
Church at the Duži Monastery

The Duži Monastery (Serbian: Манастир Дужи, romanized: Manastir Duži) is a Serbian Orthodox monastery dedicated to the Intercession of the Theotokos and located in Popovo Polje, not far from the coast of the Adriatic Sea and some 10 kilometres west of the town of Trebinje in southern Republika Srpska, Bosnia and Herzegovina.

== History ==
Duži Monastery was first mentioned in 1694, when it served as a refuge for monks from the nearby Tvrdoš Monastery which was then destroyed by Venetians during the Morean War. That year the see of the Serbian Orthodox Eparchy of Hum was transferred from Tvrdoš to Duži, where it remained until 1777, when the see was relocated to Mostar.

During the latter half of the 19th century, the monks of Duži supported the uprisings of Herzegovinian Serbs against the Ottomans, who therefore damaged and looted the monastery in 1858, 1861, and 1877. Mićo Ljubibratić, a leader of the Herzegovina Uprising of 1875–1877, had his headquarters at the Duži Monastery. In 1878, after the Congress of Berlin, Bosnia and Herzegovina were occupied by Austria-Hungary. The monastery was severely damaged by fire in 1886. Its renovation was supported by the Austro-Hungarian government of Bosnia-Herzegovina with fund of 200,000 florins. A bronze plaque was placed in the renovated church, with text in Serbian expressing gratitude to Austrian Emperor Franz Joseph.

After World War I, the monastery was inhabited by Russian monks who fled from Russia in the wake of the October Revolution. In 1935, they painted the walls of the church with frescoes in a Russian style. In 1941, three of these monks were killed by Yugoslav Partisans. The monastery was deserted after World War II, and it fell into disrepair. Between 1954 and 1958, it was used by the Yugoslav People's Army to house soldiers. In 1959, it became a nunnery, and the nuns gradually restored the dilapidated monastery. During the Yugoslav Wars in the 1990s, it was shelled by the Croatian Army, but without much damage to it. Today, the economy of the Duži Monastery involves beekeeping and the production of wine, rakia, and dairy products.

== See also ==
- List of Serbian Orthodox monasteries
