= A1 (Croatia) =

Longest motorway in Croatia

A1 motorway
- Autocesta A1
- Dalmatina
- in use under construction planned other motorways

Route information
- Part of E65 E71
- Length: 476.3 km (296.0 mi) 550.0 km (341.8 mi) planned

Major junctions
- North end: A3 in Lučko interchange
- D1 in Karlovac interchange A6 in Bosiljevo 2 interchange D8 in Zadar 1 interchange D1 in Dugopolje interchange

- South end: A10 at Ploče interchange D425 at Karamatići toll station

Location
- Country: Croatia
- Counties: City of Zagreb, Zagreb, Karlovac, Lika-Senj, Zadar, Šibenik-Knin, Split-Dalmatia, Dubrovnik-Neretva
- Major cities: Zagreb, Karlovac, Zadar, Šibenik, Split, Ploče, Dubrovnik

Highway system
- Highways in Croatia

The A1 motorway (Croatian: Autocesta A1) is the longest motorway in Croatia, spanning 476.3 kilometers (296.0 mi). As it connects the nation's capital Zagreb, in the north of the country, to the second largest city Split on the shore of the Adriatic Sea, the motorway represents a major north–south transportation corridor in Croatia and a significant part of the Adriatic–Ionian motorway. Apart from Zagreb and Split, the A1 motorway runs near a number of major Croatian cities, and provides access to several national parks or nature parks, world heritage sites, and numerous resorts, especially along the Adriatic coast. The national significance of the motorway is reflected through its positive economic impact on the cities and towns it connects as well as its importance to tourism in Croatia.

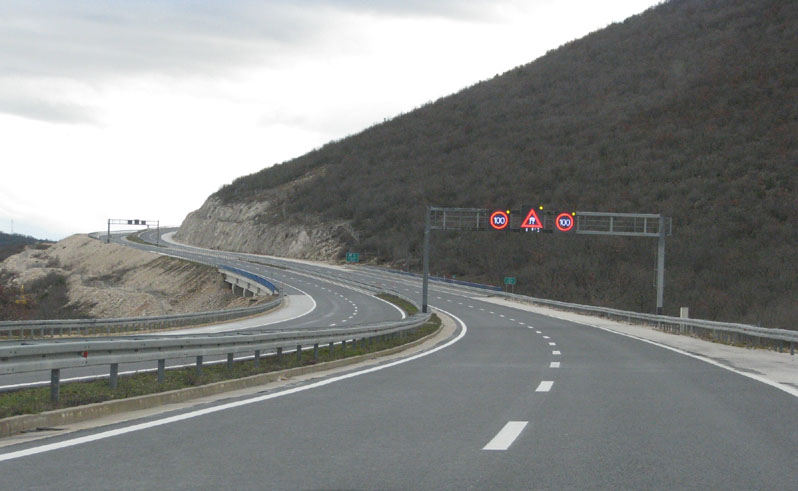
The A1 motorway near Trogir, variable traffic signs

The motorway consists of two traffic lanes and an emergency lane in each driving direction separated by a central reservation. All intersections of the A1 motorway are grade separated. As the route traverses rugged mountainous and coastal terrain, it has required 376 bridges, viaducts, tunnels and other similar structures in sections completed as of 2014, including the two longest tunnels in Croatia and two bridges comprising spans of 200 meters (660 ft) or more. There are 33 exits and 26 rest areas along the route. As the motorway is tolled using a ticket system and vehicle classification in Croatia, each exit includes a toll plaza.

A motorway connecting Zagreb and Split was designed in the early 1970s, and a public loan was started in order to collect sufficient funds for its construction. However, due to political upheavals in Croatia and Yugoslavia, construction of the motorway was labeled a "nationalist project" and cancelled in 1971. After Croatian independence and the conclusion of the Croatian War of Independence, efforts to build the motorway were renewed and construction started in 2000. The Zagreb–Split section of the route was completed by 2005, while the first sections between Split and Dubrovnik opened in 2007 and 2008. Construction costs incurred so far amount to 3 billion euro. The figure includes funds approved for construction work scheduled to be completed by 2013. The amount does not include construction cost related to the Lučko–Bosiljevo 2 section since that section was funded as a part of Rijeka–Zagreb motorway construction project through Autocesta Rijeka–Zagreb, current operator of that sector. The remainder of the A1 motorway, i.e., the sections south of the Bosiljevo 2 interchange are operated by Hrvatske autoceste.

== Route description ==
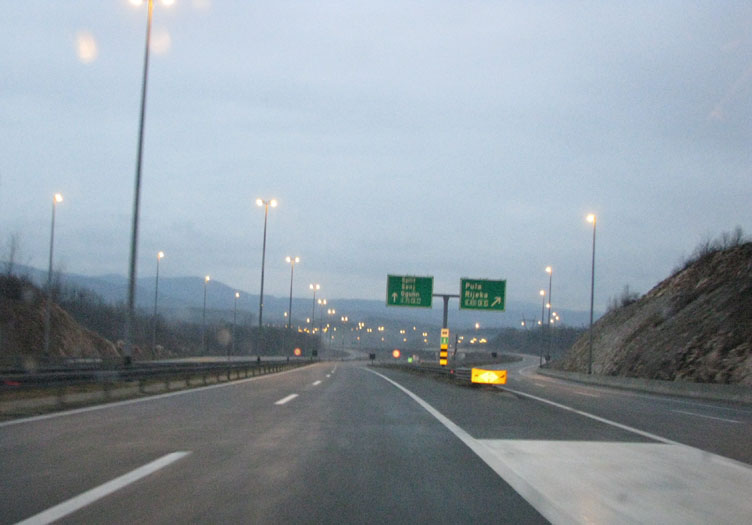
The A6 motorway branching off in Bosiljevo 2 interchange

The A1 motorway (Croatian: Autocesta A1) is a major north–south motorway in Croatia connecting the capital of the country, Zagreb, to the Dalmatia region, where the motorway follows a route parallel to the Adriatic coast. As a part of the road network of Croatia, it is a part of two major European routes: E65 Prague–Bratislava–Zagreb–Rijeka–Split–Dubrovnik and E71 Budapest–Zagreb–Karlovac–Bihać–Knin–Split. The motorway is of major importance to Croatia in terms of development of the economy; especially tourism and as a transit transport route. This has been reflected by an accelerated development of regions connected by the A1 motorway. A part of the motorway is considered to be a segment of the Adriatic–Ionian motorway. Once the latter motorway's connecting sections are completed, those currently spanned just by the Adriatic Highway as well as two-lane roads in Slovenia and Albania, the A1 will achieve genuine importance as a transit route.

The motorway spans 476.3 kilometers (296.0 mi) between Zagreb (Lučko interchange) and Ploče via Split. The route serves Karlovac via D1, Gospić via D534, Zadar via D8 and D424 and Šibenik via D533. The A1 motorway consists of two traffic lanes and an emergency lane in each driving direction along its entire length. The sole exception is Drežnik Viaduct where there are no emergency lanes. Almost all of the existing interchanges are trumpet interchanges, except for Lučko which is a stack. There are numerous rest areas along the motorway, providing various types of services ranging from simple parking spaces and restrooms to petrol stations, restaurants and hotels. As of 2011, the motorway has 33 interchanges, providing access to numerous towns and cities and the Croatian state road network. The ultimate southern terminus of the motorway has been established to be near Dubrovnik.

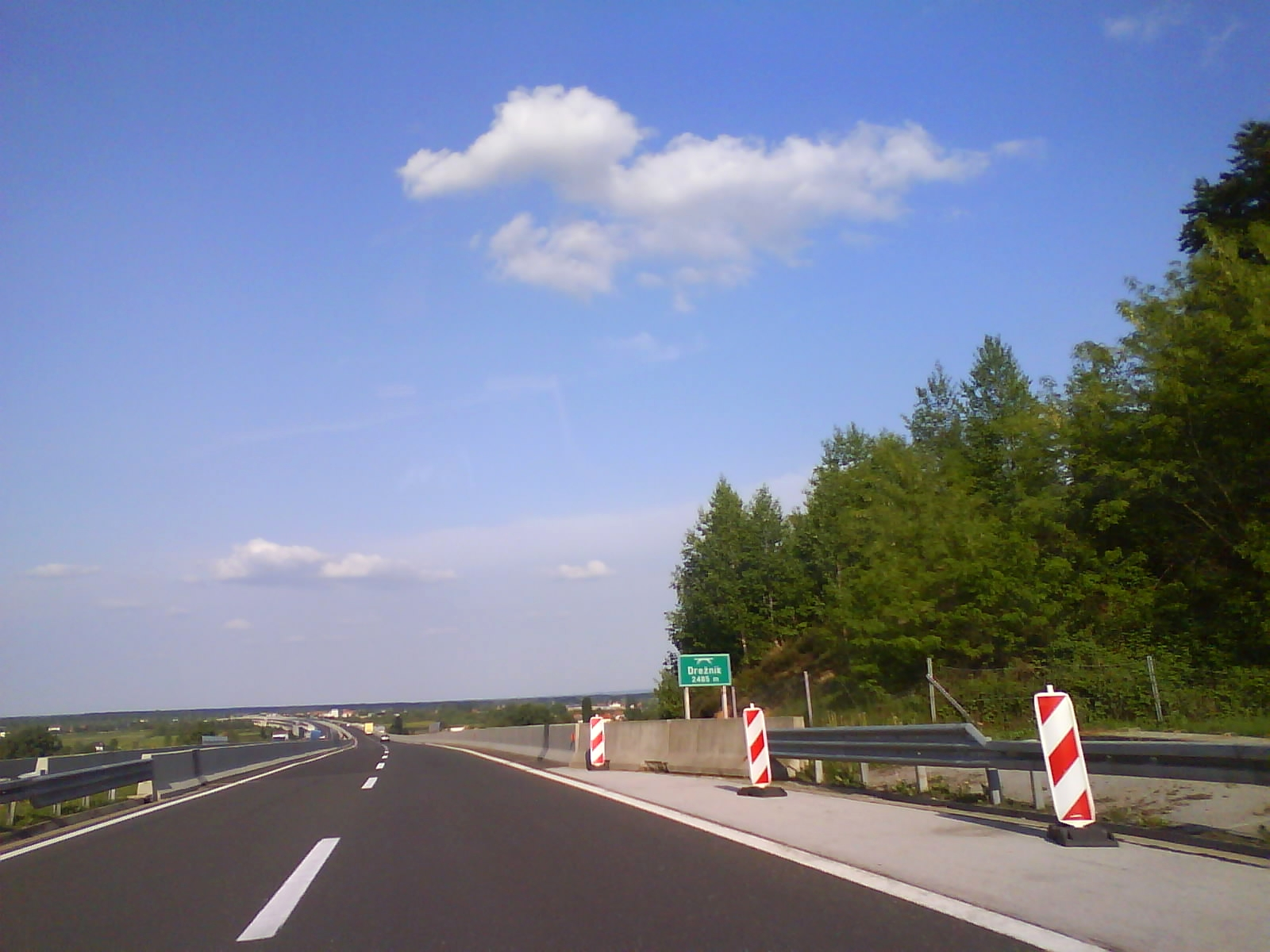
Approach to Drežnik Viaduct

Between the Lučko and Bosiljevo 2 interchanges, the motorway follows Pan-European corridor Vb, and is concurrent with the Zagreb–Rijeka motorway. The Bosiljevo 2 interchange distributes southbound A1 traffic flowing to Rijeka (via the A6 motorway) and to Split. That 67-kilometer (42 mi) segment of the motorway is operated by Autocesta Rijeka–Zagreb, while the remainder of the motorway is operated by Hrvatske autoceste.

An automatic traffic monitoring and guidance system is in place along the motorway. It consists of measuring, control and signaling devices, located in zones where driving conditions may vary—at interchanges, near viaducts, bridges, tunnels, and in zones where fog and strong wind are known to occur. The system comprises variable traffic signs used to communicate changing driving conditions, possible restrictions and other information to motorway users.

It serves, either directly or via connecting roads, a large number of tourist destinations such as Bjelolasica in Gorski Kotar, a large number of Adriatic Sea resorts and several national parks and nature parks. In Lika region those are Plitvice Lakes National Park, Sjeverni Velebit National Park and Velebit Nature Park, while in Dalmatia the motorway serves Paklenica National Park, Telašćica Nature Park, Kornati National Park, Lake Vrana Nature Park, Krka National Park and Biokovo Nature Park. The route also provides links to a number of UNESCO World Heritage Sites such as Plitvice Lakes, Šibenik Cathedral of St James, Palace of Diocletian in Split and the Historic City of Trogir.

== Toll ==
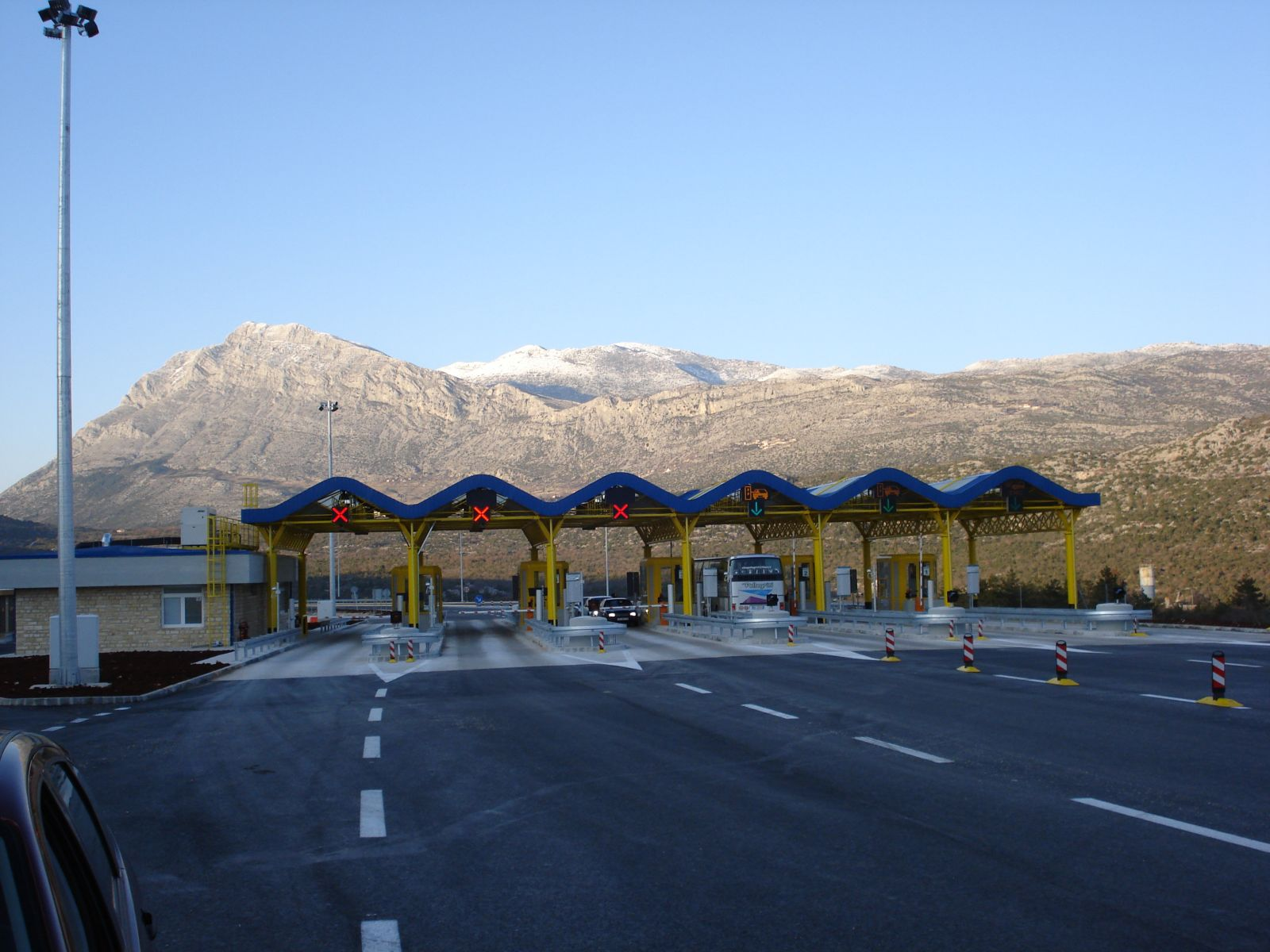
Ravča toll plaza

The A1 is a tolled motorway based on the vehicle classification in Croatia using a closed toll system integrated with the A6 motorway as the two connect in the Bosiljevo 2 interchange forming a unified toll system. Since the two motorways are operated by Autocesta Rijeka — Zagreb and Hrvatske autoceste, the toll collection system is operated jointly by the two operators. The toll is payable in Croatian kuna, euro, major credit and debit cards and using a number of prepaid toll collection systems including various types of smart cards issued by the motorway operators and ENC – an electronic toll collection (ETC) which is shared at all motorways in Croatia (except the A2 motorway) and provides drivers use of dedicated lanes at toll plazas and a discounted toll rates.

The A1 north of the Bosiljevo 2 interchange is operated by Autocesta Rijeka — Zagreb and the rest is operated by Hrvatske autoceste, both of which do not report company toll income separately for individual sections of various motorways. Total toll income reported by Hrvatske autoceste in the first half of 2011 was 508.1 million kuna (68.3 million euro). This figure pertains to the A1 south of the Bosiljevo 2 interchange as well as all other motorways operated by Hrvatske autoceste, however the A1 represents the longest and the busiest tolled motorway operated by Hrvatske autoceste. Toll income reported by Autocesta Rijeka — Zagreb for the first half of 2011 is 191.2 million kuna (25.7 million euro). This sum includes company toll income generated elsewhere, however the A1 section represents the busiest section of the motorway network operated by Autocesta Rijeka — Zagreb. Hrvatske autoceste and Autocesta Rijeka — Zagreb reported increase of the toll income compared to the same period of 2010 of 2.2% and 5% respectively.

Summertime and holiday queues at Lučko mainline toll plaza can be considerable, a problem exacerbated during the usual weekend-to-weekend tourist stays at Croatia's coastal resorts. In 2009, in an effort to address the problem, the Lučko mainline toll plaza was expanded to 15 lanes, and a single additional 10-lane toll plaza was built for fast cashless toll collection in Demerje. The Demerje toll plaza is available via a motorway fork accessible to the A1 northbound traffic only. Vehicles using the Demerje toll plaza default to the original motorway route immediately past the Lučko mainline toll plaza, between the plaza and the Lučko interchange. The faster cashless system has raised the nominal capacity of the road from 2,325 to 11,150 vehicles per hour. As of September 2010 northbound traffic leaving the A1 must exit the tolled motorway network, since the existing Zagreb bypass is not tolled, and then re-enter another tolled motorway. There are plans for the outer Zagreb bypass to be integrated into the tolled motorway network, as the ultimate solution for congestion at the Lučko toll plaza. That will require construction of a Horvati interchange south of the Lučko toll plaza.

== Notable structures ==
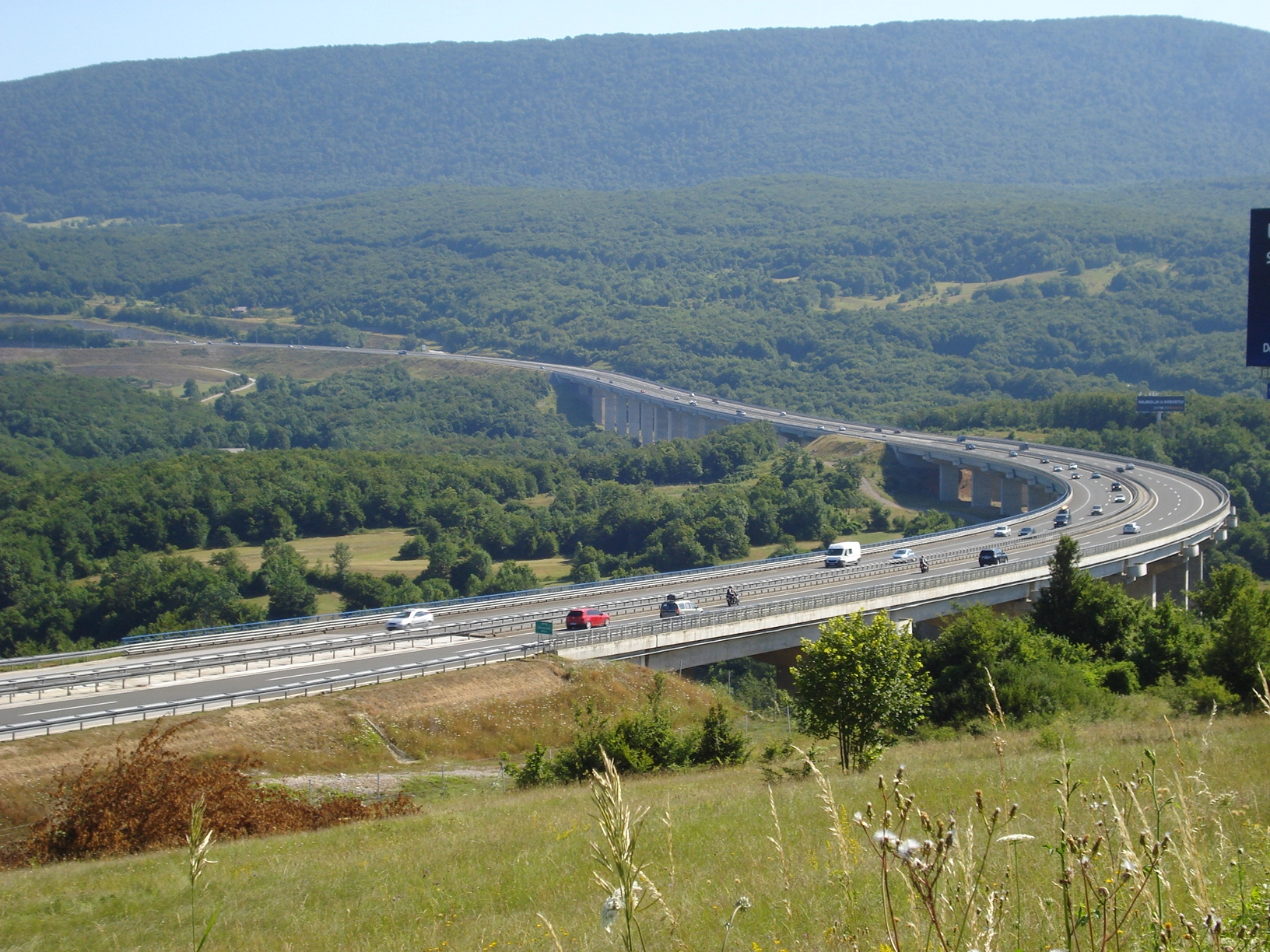
Jezerane Viaduct

A total of 361 structures—bridges, viaducts, flyovers, underpasses, passages, wildlife crossings, and tunnels—have been completed on the motorway between Zagreb and Vrgorac, and calculations indicate that 18.6 percent of the route between Zagreb and Split is located on those structures, which is a quite considerable percentage for a motorway of this length. By June 2011, Ravča-Vrgorac section was completed, including 5 viaducts, 4 flyovers and a tunnel. An additional 15 structures were built on the section between Vrgorac and Ploče, plus on the connection towards the city of Ploče.

Completed structures summary by sector
Sector	Total	Bridges	Viaducts	Flyovers	Underpasses	Passages	Tunnels	Wildlife crossings
Lučko (Zagreb) — Bosiljevo	55	3	9	13	13	16	1	-
Bosiljevo 2 — Sveti Rok	116	16	17	38	29	3	5	4
Sveti Rok — Dugopolje (Split)	121	7	24	40	36	6	8	1
Dugopolje — Vrgorac	69	1	16	13	29	-	8*	2
Vrgorac — Karamatići**	15	-	7	2	2	-	4	-
Total**	376	27	73	167	109	25	26*	7
*including 3 cut-and-cover tunnels.
**Because of a common construction project and a common toll system, the totals also include the 5 km connector to the D425, from the Ploče interchange to the Karamatići toll plaza.

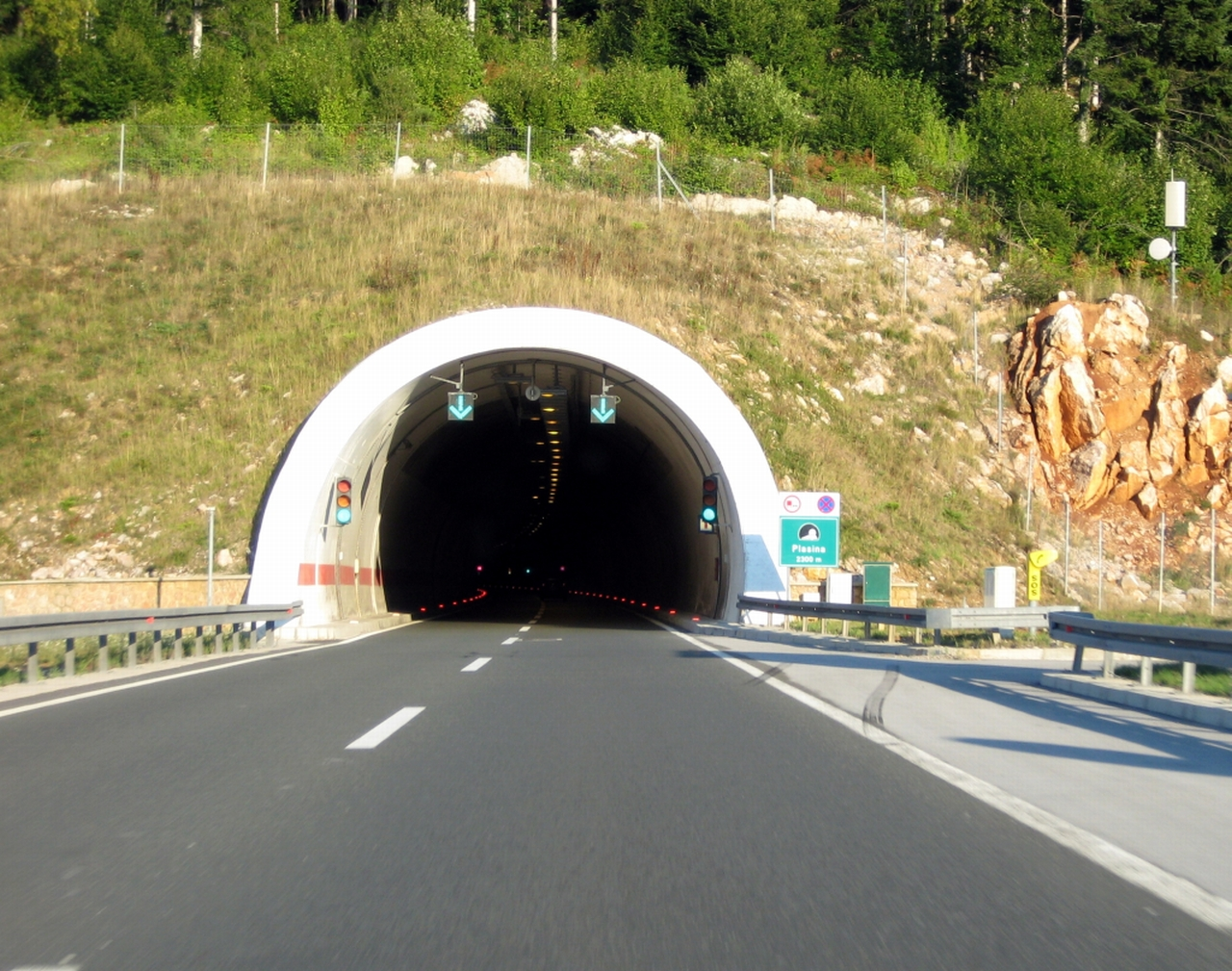
Plasina Tunnel portal

As of September 2010, there are seven tunnels longer than 1,000 meters (3,300 ft) on the A1 motorway. The most notable among them are: the 5,821-meter (19,098 ft) long Mala Kapela Tunnel between Ogulin and Brinje interchanges and the 5,768-meter (18,924 ft) long Sveti Rok Tunnel between Sveti Rok and Maslenica interchanges. The Mala Kapela and Sveti Rok tunnels are not only the largest individual structures on the motorway but they are also the longest tunnels in Croatia. The tunnels separate three distinct climate zones. The Mala Kapela Tunnel spans between the continental climate of the central Croatia and the mountain climate of Lika, while the Sveti Rok Tunnel provides a link between Lika and its mountain climate and the Mediterranean climate of Dalmatia. Both of the Mala Kapela and Sveti Rok tunnels were originally operated as single tubes when they were opened for traffic in June 2005 until 30 May 2009, when the second tubes of the tunnels were also opened for traffic. The other major tunnels on the A1 motorway are the 2,300-meter (7,500 ft) long Plasina Tunnel situated between Otočac and Perušić interchanges and the Grič, Brinje and Konjsko tunnels. Lengths of the latter three range between 1,122 meters (3,681 ft) and 1,542 meters (5,059 ft).

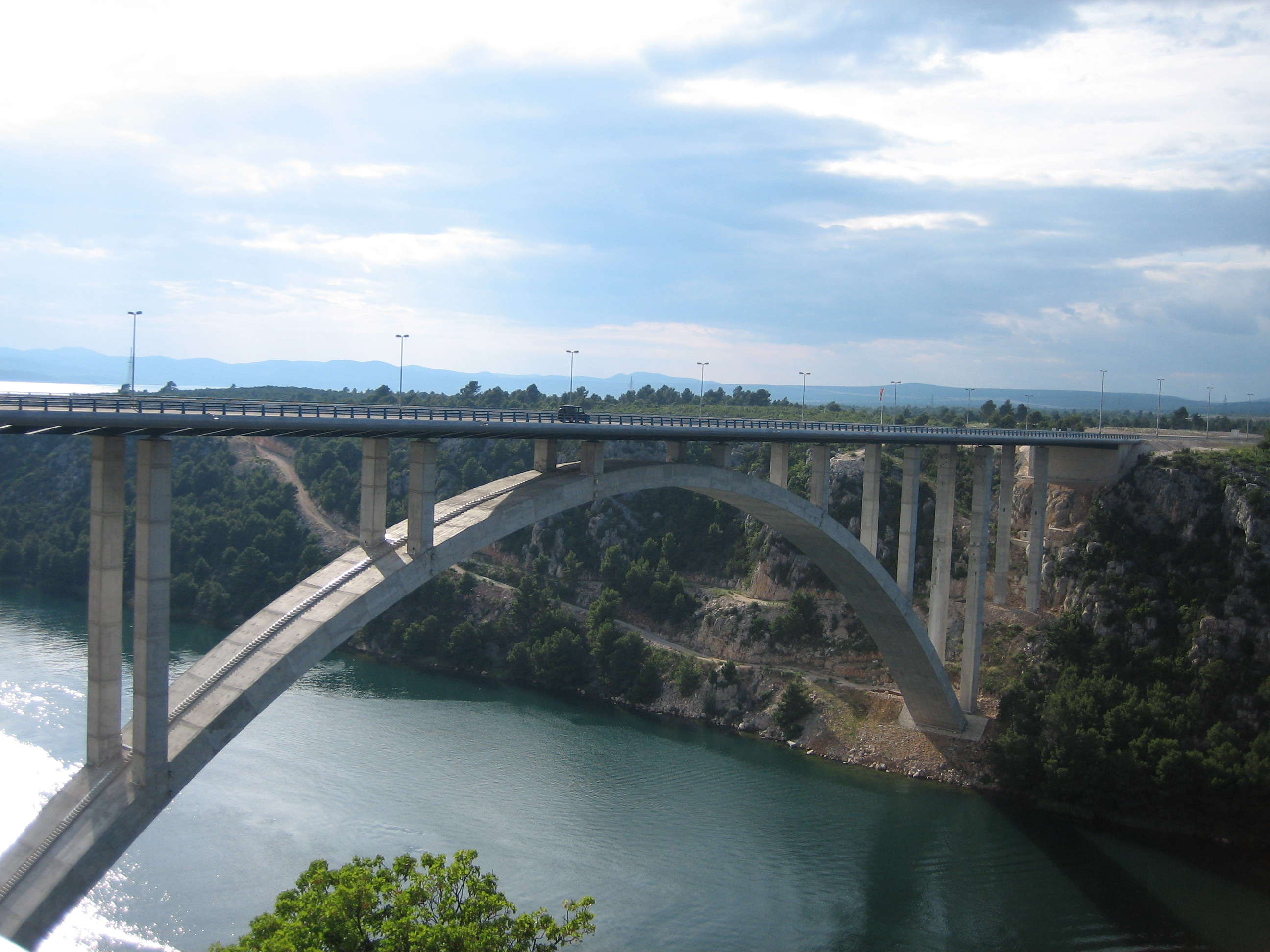
Krka Bridge

The longest bridge on the A1 motorway is the 546-meter (1,791 ft) long Dobra Bridge spanning Dobra River near Karlovac. Other major bridges on the route are the Gacka, Miljanica and Dabar bridges—all of them longer than 350 meters (1,150 ft). Also, the A1 motorway comprises the 391-meter (1,283 ft) long Krka Bridge spanning Krka River and the 378-meter (1,240 ft) long Maslenica Bridge spanning Novsko Ždrilo strait. The Maslenica and Krka bridges are particularly significant as their respective main spans are 200 m (660 ft) long.

The A1 motorway also comprises the longest viaduct in Croatia — the 2,485-meter (8,153 ft) long Drežnik Viaduct situated between the Karlovac and Bosiljevo 1 interchanges. As of 2011, there are six other major viaducts completed on the route–— the Kotezi Viaduct, Modruš 1, Mokro Polje, Jezerane, Srijane and Rašćane viaducts. All of them are longer than 500 meters (1,600 ft). The latest significant viaduct completed as a part of the Ravča–Vrgorac section is the Kotezi Viaduct at 1,214 meters (3,983 ft), surpassing all other viaducts on the route except for Drežnik Viaduct. A dispute concerning naming of the Viaduct arose one month prior to opening of the motorway section containing the viaduct, and the structure was even signposted as the Bunina Viaduct for several days in June 2011, only to revert the name to the Kotezi Viaduct days prior to the opening ceremony itself. The section also comprises the 402-meter (1,319 ft) long Šare Viaduct.

== History ==
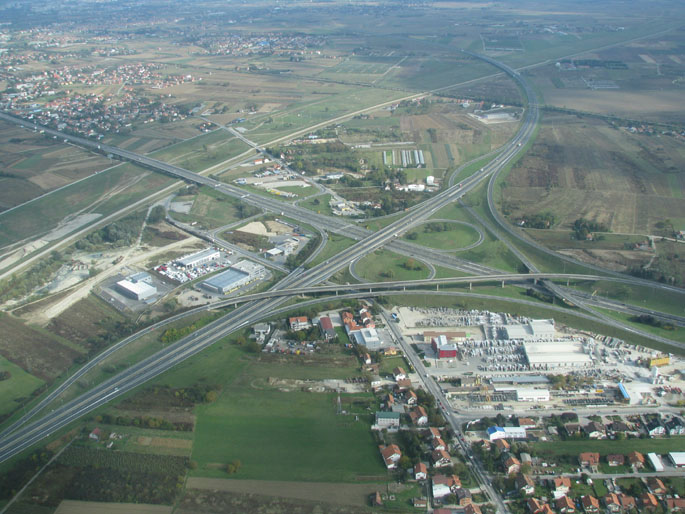
Lučko interchange

The A1 motorway was originally designed in the early 1970s, albeit along a different route than the present Zagreb–Split motorway route. After suppression of the Croatian Spring and removal of the Croatian leadership that proposed and adopted the construction plan in 1971, all the work related to the Zagreb–Split motorway was cancelled. The plans were revived in the 1990s and new designs were developed to include a motorway section built between Zagreb and Karlovac into the design so that the section could be shared between Zagreb–Split and Zagreb–Rijeka motorways. Construction work started in 2000 and the motorway reached Split by 2005 and was extended towards Dubrovnik later on. Both in the 1970s and in the 2000s, construction of the Zagreb–Split motorway was perceived to symbolize rebuilding of national unity.

=== King Tomislav Motorway ===
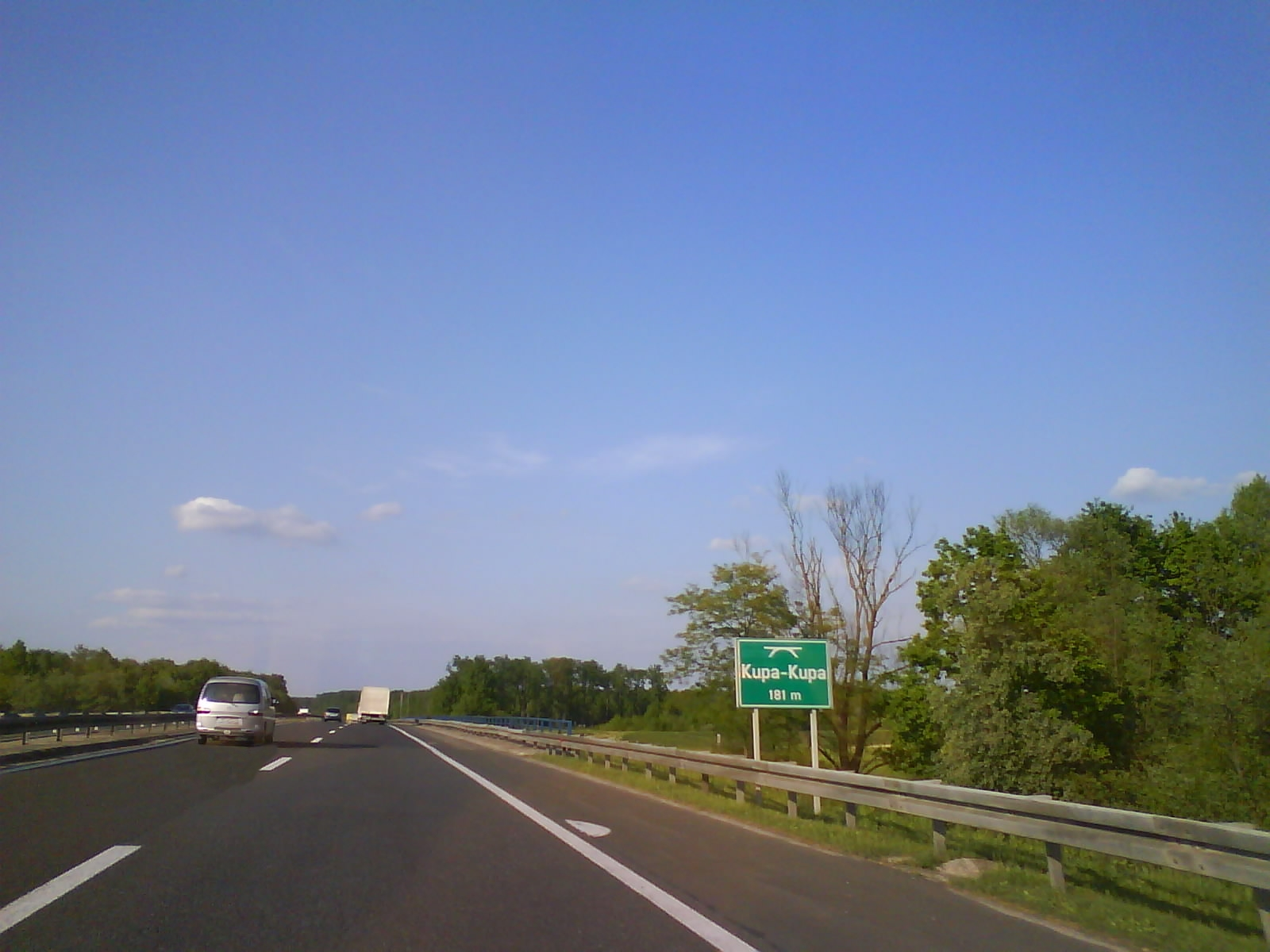
The oldest section of the A1 motorway, near Karlovac

The Zagreb–Split motorway, now the A1 motorway, was one of three routes defined by the Parliament of the Socialist Republic of Croatia on 5 March 1971, as priority transport routes of Croatia that were to be developed as motorways. Originally the motorway was designed to follow a route from Zagreb to Bihać (Bosnia and Herzegovina) and then to Split via Knin. The government of Bosnia and Herzegovina issued its approval for the route in Bihać region in the same year. Construction of the motorway was initiated by a fundraising effort — a public loan. The funds gathered initially through the public loan were sufficient for construction of 20 kilometers (12 mi) of the motorway.

The 39.3-kilometer (24.4 mi) long Zagreb–Karlovac section of the Zagreb–Rijeka motorway, now part of the A1 motorway, was completed in 1972. Further construction of motorways from Zagreb to Rijeka and Split was suspended for the next 28 years following a political decision of the Croatian leadership, newly installed during Yugoslav suppression of the Croatian Spring, to "stop megalomaniac projects". It is considered that the true reason for the cancellation of the works was that the motorway was considered to be a "nationalist" project. The conclusion is supported by the fact the road was spontaneously nicknamed King Tomislav Motorway (Croatian: Autocesta kralja Tomislava) by citizens investing their money through the public loan after the first king of medieval Croatia, who united Croatia as a single kingdom in 925. The funds raised through the public loan were left unused for several months, then spent for construction of a road between Vrlika and Strmica via Knin, now a part of the D1 and D30 state roads. However, the United Nations Economic Commission for Europe recognized the route as the southernmost part of the Pyhrn route, giving it the designation E59 in 1975. Subsequent reorganizations of the E-road network, including the latest one in 2008, transferred the route south of Zagreb to the E71.

=== Dalmatina ===
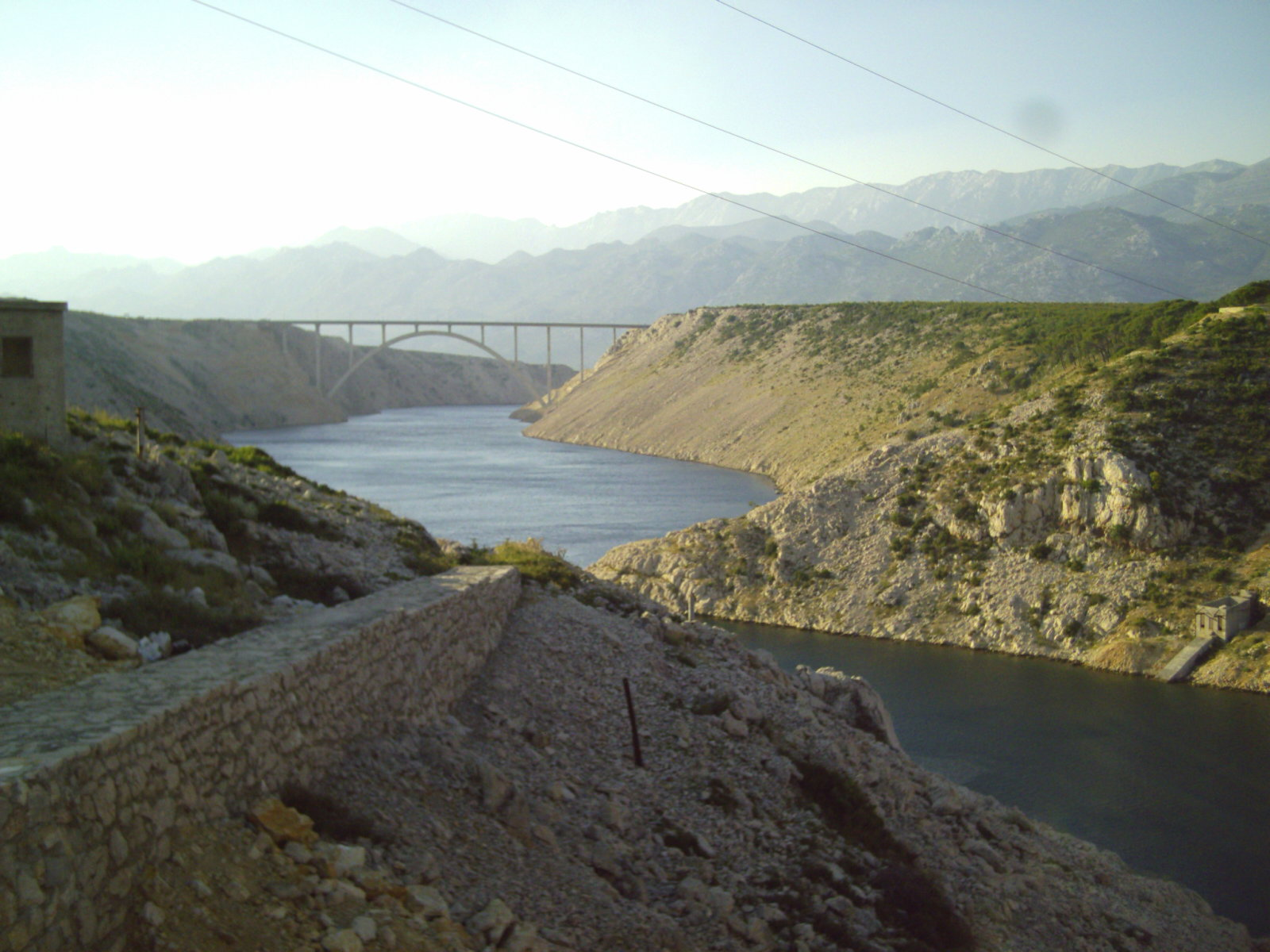
Maslenica Bridge carrying the A1 motorway

In the beginning of the 1990s, construction of the motorway was further postponed because of onset of the Croatian War of Independence. The decade saw renewed discussion regarding construction of the motorway, including renewed considerations of its route. Soon, the originally devised route running through Bihać was set aside and two new routes were considered: One of them was a modified version of the original route, bypassing Bihać and running through the Plitvice Lakes region while the other was a completely new route further to the west via Gospić and Zadar, which was eventually accepted for construction. Both of the alternative routes proposed that the Zagreb–Karlovac motorway already completed in 1972 were to be used as the northernmost section of the Zagreb–Split and Zagreb–Rijeka motorways.

The A1 was a showpiece project of the Croatian government and a symbol of uniting the country. The first attempt to revive the project in earnest occurred in the 1993, when the excavation of Sveti Rok Tunnel began. More comprehensive construction work started in 2000 and Karlovac–Vukova Gorica section opened in 2001. In 2003, the first sections not shared with the Zagreb–Rijeka Motorway were completed: Vukova Gorica–Mala Kapela Tunnel and Gornja Ploča–Zadar 2. Mala Kapela Tunnel–Gornja Ploča, Zadar 2–Pirovac and Vrpolje–Dugopolje sections opened in 2004 and Mala Kapela Tunnel itself and Pirovac–Vrpolje section opened in 2005 marking completion of the Zagreb–Split Motorway, culminating with the grand opening of Karlovac — Split section on 26 June 2005.

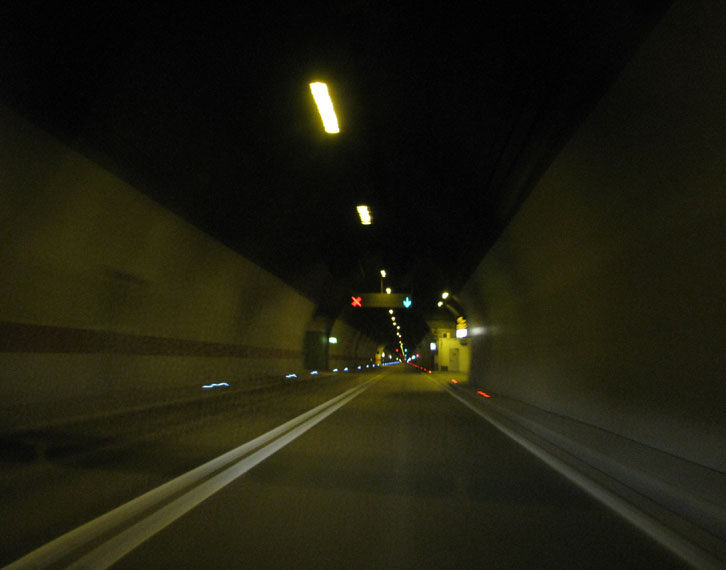
Mala Kapela Tunnel, prior to opening of the 2nd tunnel tube

Construction of the motorway along its Split–Dubrovnik sector started once the motorway sectors north of Split were complete, and the section between Split (Dugopolje interchange) and Šestanovac interchange opened on 27 June 2007. The last sections to be completed to date are Šestanovac–Ravča, opened on 22 December 2008, Ravča-Vrgorac section opened on 30 June 2011, and the Vrgorac-Ploče section opened on 20 December 2013. In the 2000s, as the motorway construction works were gradually progressing further south, the motorway earned its unofficial, yet widely used name—Dalmatina in Croatian press because it connected Zagreb to Dalmatia. In 2010, Donja Zdenčina interchange was opened between Lučko and Jastrebarsko interchanges, and in June 2012, Novigrad interchange opened bringing number of motorway exits to 33.

=== Construction cost ===
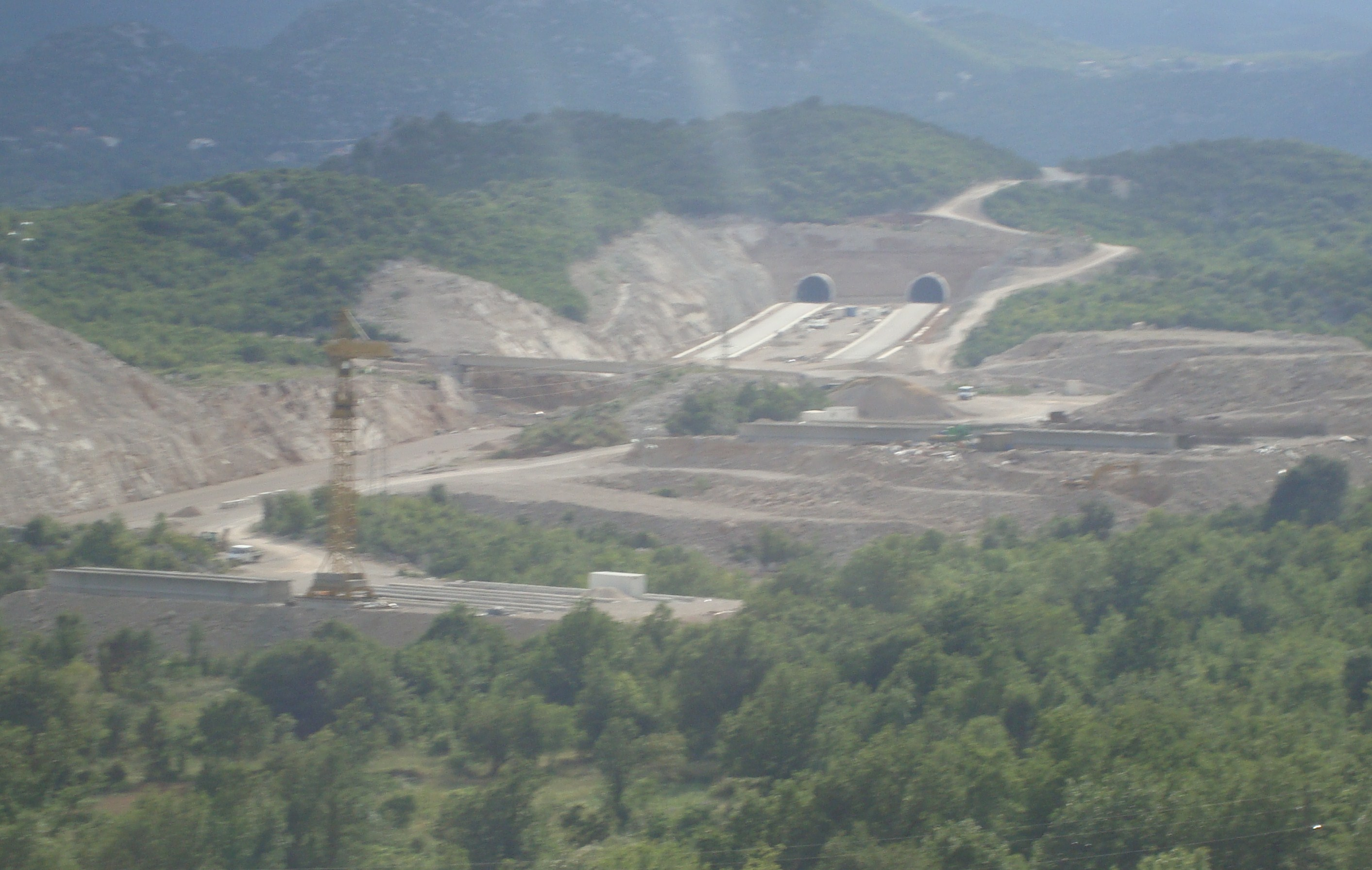
Motorway construction works near Vrgorac in 2010.

The construction cost for the Bosiljevo 2–Split (Dugopolje interchange) sector of the motorway was originally estimated by the government in 2001 and presented as "3 × 3 x 3" – that is, the 300 kilometers (190 mi) of the motorway was to be completed in 3 years at a cost of 3 billion marks (approximately 12.65 billion kuna at the time, or approximately 1.533 billion euros). In 2010, Hrvatske autoceste reported that the average cost of one kilometer of Bosiljevo–Split motorway was 7.1 million euro, which would mean that the total construction cost was 2.21 billion euro for that 311.4 kilometers (193.5 mi) long segment.

Construction cost incurred on the Dugopolje–Ploče sector of the motorway between 2005 and 2008 was reported at 4.1 billion kuna and additional 1.8 billion kuna of construction expenses are planned until the end of 2012 (representing approximately 560 and 245 million euro, respectively). The latter figure includes construction of the D425 state road but it does not include full completion of the Vrgorac–Ploče section.

== Further construction ==
The ultimate southern terminus of the motorway was defined to be near Dubrovnik by a 2003 legislation by the Ministry of Maritime Affairs, Transport and Infrastructure. In 2022 the same ministry updated the document with a definition of the A1 ending with "Opuzen – Zavala (border of Croatia and Bosnia and Herzegovina) – Imotica (ditto border) – Dubrovnik".

Hrvatske autoceste, operator of the southern portion of the A1 motorway, ordered the execution of design documents, feasibility and environmental impact studies for the Doli – Osojnik section of the motorway that is to be constructed near Dubrovnik. Commencement of construction on this section was originally scheduled for 2009. Despite an official ceremony to mark commencement of construction works on the section, no works beyond design and study development has been carried out there.

Area around the city of Neum (marked red) separates Dubrovnik and Pelješac from the rest of Croatia

The A1 motorway route between Ploče and Doli (Note: Approximate coordinates: 42.824693°N 17.790241°E) has not been fixed yet, as several options exist, all of which require the route to cross either an embayment of the Adriatic Sea or a part of the territory of Bosnia and Herzegovina. While the construction of the Pelješac Bridge, spanning the coast south of Ploče and the Pelješac peninsula, had been associated with A1, its design includes only one traffic lane in each direction unlike the A1 motorway standard of two.

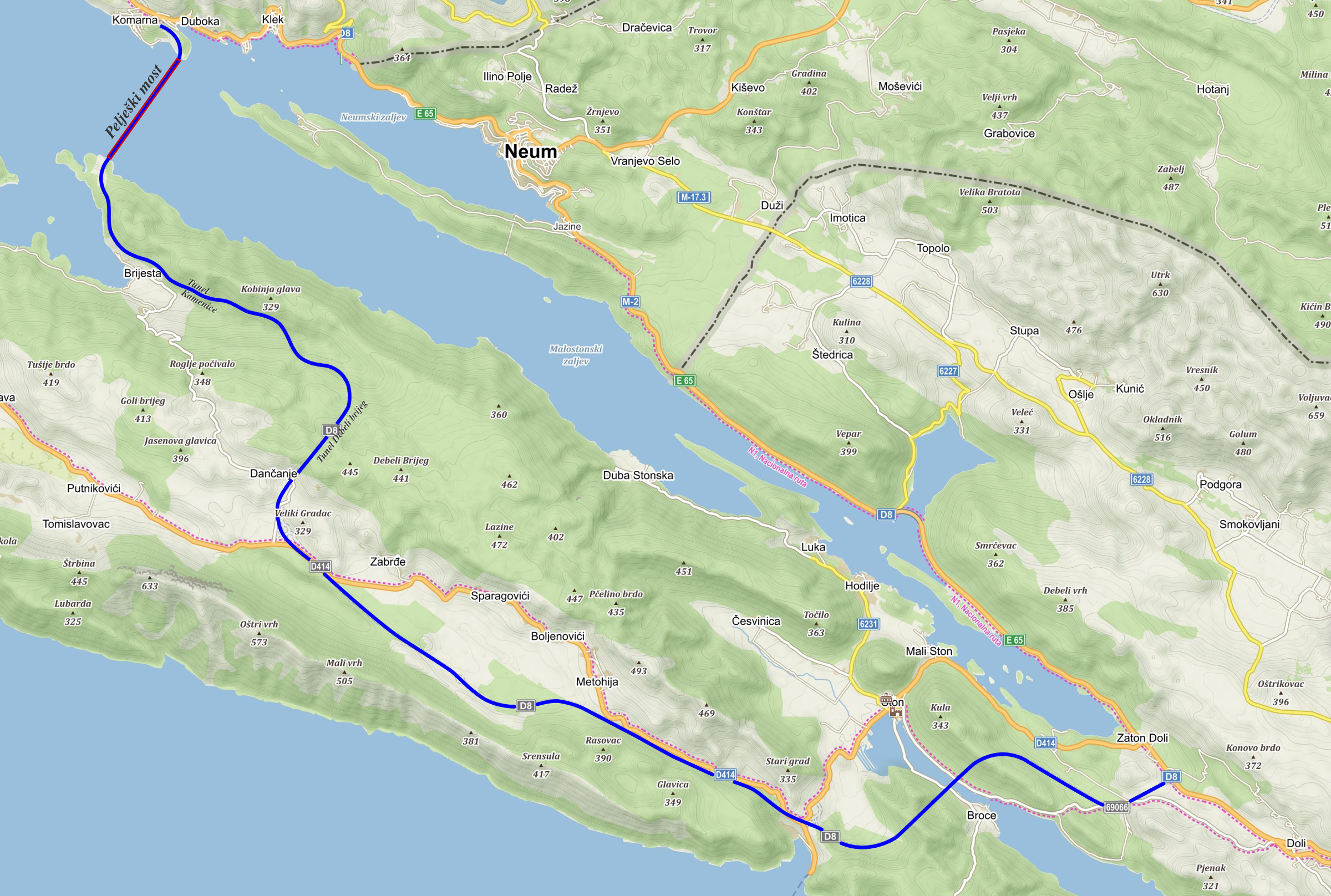
Pelješac bridge and new link roads

In April 2012, government of Bosnia-Herzegovina proposed a route in Neum area to connect Ploče and Dubrovnik while serving Neum. That entails branching of the A1 motorway 7 to 8 kilometres (4.3 to 5.0 miles) west of Neum, one branch serving Neum and the other Dubrovnik. As of July 2012 no decision was reached on the section of the A1 route.

A planned modification of the existing route encompasses construction of a directional T interchange to replace the existing trumpet interchange built at Žuta Lokva. The new interchange is only planned to be built once the A7 motorway is completed between the Rijeka bypass and Žuta Lokva. It shall not feature any weaving, similar to the Bosiljevo 2 interchange of the A1 and A6 motorways.

Rudine – Osojnik (Dubrovnik) section – Currently, while construction permits are being obtained. The construction is planned to begin in the spring of 2024.

== Traffic volume ==
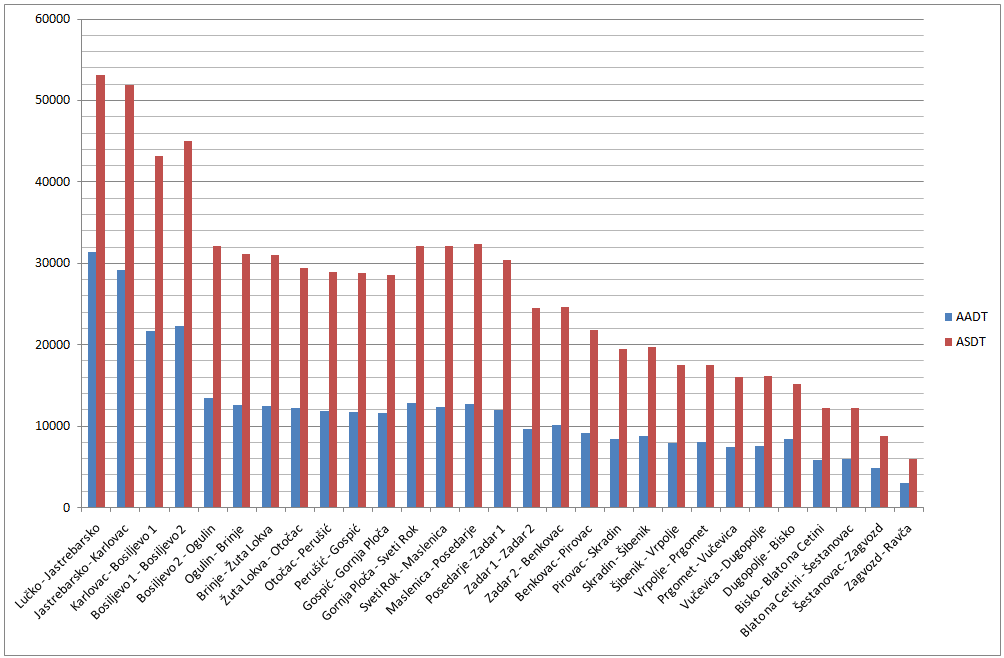
Traffic volume measured on the A1 motorway (2009)

Traffic is regularly counted by means of traffic census at toll stations and reported by Autocesta Rijeka–Zagreb and Hrvatske autoceste—the operators of the northern and the southern portions of the motorway respectively. The reported traffic volume gradually decreases as the motorway chainage increases and as it passes by various major destinations and the interchanges that serve them. Thus the greatest volume of traffic is registered between Jastrebarsko and Lučko interchanges – with 31,432 vehicle annual average daily traffic (AADT), and 53,216 vehicle average summer daily traffic (ASDT) figures as that is the section closest to Zagreb. South of the Bosiljevo 2 interchange the first major drop of traffic volume is recorded on the A1 motorway, due to traffic transferring to the A6 motorway towards Rijeka. Other similar changes of the traffic volume are registered near Zadar (served by Zadar 1 and Zadar 2 interchanges) and Split served by Dugopolje interchange. Substantial variations observed between AADT and ASDT are normally attributed to the fact that the motorway carries significant tourist traffic. The seasonal increase traffic volume variations ranges 69% on the busiest, Lučko–Jastrebarsko section to 160% as measured on Sveti Rok–Maslenica section. The summer season traffic volume increase on the motorway is 120%.

A1 traffic volume details in 2016

Road	Counting site	AADT	ASDT	Section
A1	1916 Lučko south	34,133	60,402	Lučko–Zdenčina
A1	1931Zdenčina south	33,558	60,695	Zdenčina-Jastrebarsko
A1	1920 Jastrebarsko south	31,242	59,058	Jastrebarsko–Karlovac
A1	1804 Karlovac south	24,956	51,393	Karlovac–Novigrad
A1	3027 Novigrad	24,549	52,045	Karlovac–Bosiljevo 1
A1	3021 Bosiljevo 1 west	25,081	53,749	Bosiljevo 1–Bosiljevo 2
A1	3009 Bosiljevo 2 south	16,009	40,764	Bosiljevo 2–Ogulin
A1	3025 Ogulin south	15,103	39,352	Ogulin–Brinje
A1	4214 Brinje south	14,971	39,238	Brinje–Žuta Lokva
A1	4215 Žuta Lokva south	14,634	37,669	Žuta Lokva–Otočac
A1	4216 Otočac south	14,332	37,106	Otočac–Perušić
A1	4217 Perušić south	14,162	36,908	Perušić–Gospić
A1	4919 Gospić south	13,969	36,577	Gospić–Gornja Ploča
A1	4903 Gornja Ploča south	15,565	40,707	Gornja Ploča–Sveti Rok
A1	4909 Sveti Rok south	15,150	40,066	Sveti Rok–Rovanjska
A1	4805 Maslenica south	15,209	40,053	Rovanjska–Posedarje
A1	4806 Posedarje south	14,531	37,995	Posedarje–Zadar 1
A1	4809 Zadar 1 south	11,757	31,153	Zadar 1–Zadar 2
A1	4921 Zadar 2	12,301	31,120	Zadar 2–Benkovac
A1	5313 Benkovac south	11,472	28,920	Benkovac–Pirovac
A1	5314 Pirovac south	10,707	26,201	Pirovac–Skradin
A1	5315 Skradin south	11,098	26,454	Skradin–Šibenik
A1	5316 Šibenik south	10,125	24,090	Šibenik–Vrpolje
A1	5410 Vrpolje south	10,235	24,090	Vrpolje–Prgomet
A1	5411 Prgomet south	9,221	21,340	Prgomet–Vučevica
A1	5417 Vučevica south	9,273	21,391	Vučevica–Dugopolje
A1	5517 Dugopolje south	9,963	20,110	Dugopolje–Bisko
A1	5911 Bisko south	7,820	17,346	Bisko–Blato na Cetini
A1	5912 Blato na Cetini south	8,061	17,488	Blato na Cetini–Šestanovac
A1	6015 Šestanovac south	7,499	15,875	Šestanovac–Zagvozd
A1	6017 Zagvozd south	4,875	10,413	Zagvozd–Ravča
A1	6021 Ravča south	4,717	10,173	Ravča-Vrgorac
A1	6028 Vrgorac south	4,424	9,633	Vrgorac-Ploče
A1	6030 Ploče south	3,502	7,892	Ploče

== Rest areas ==
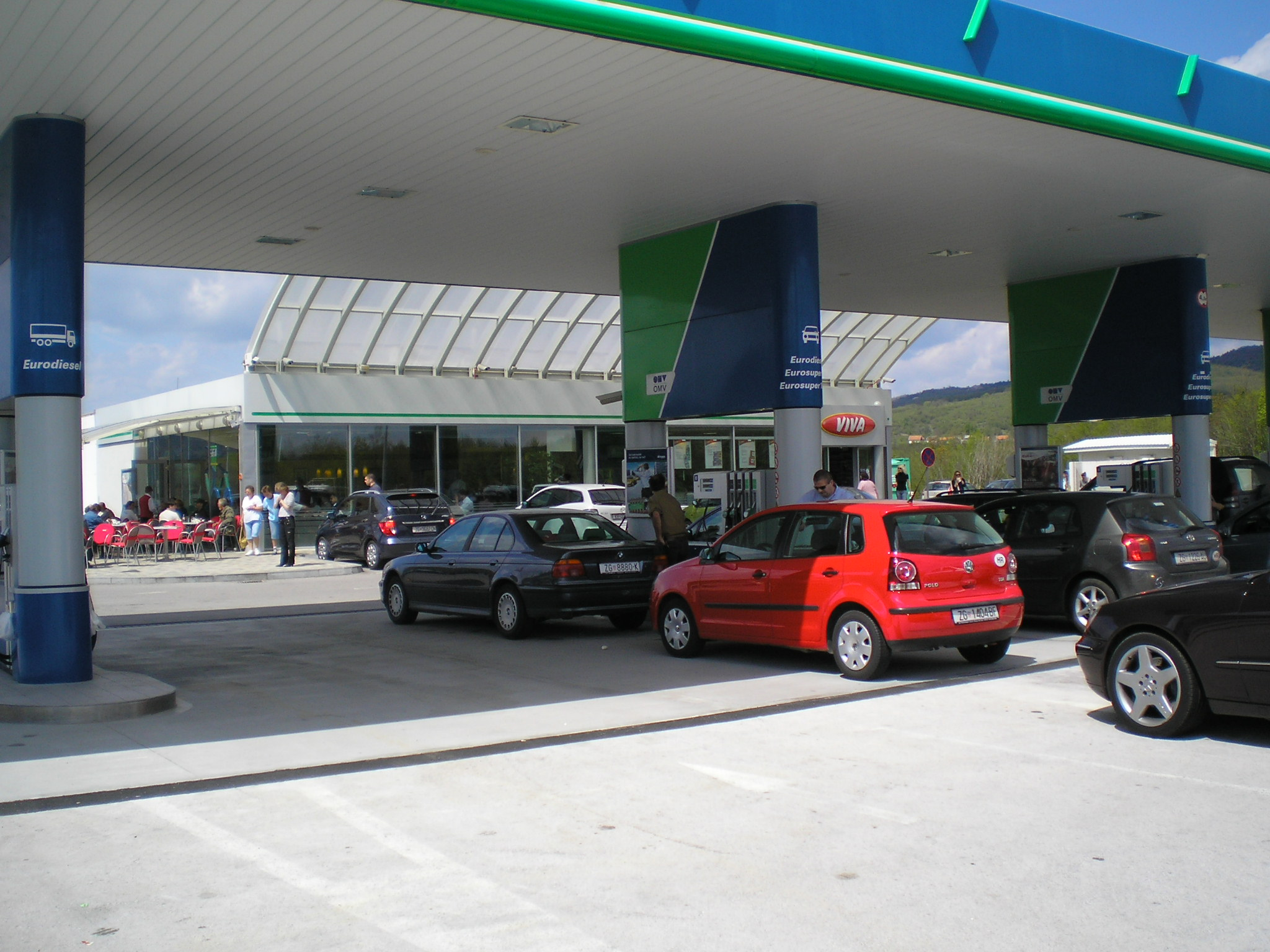
Janjče rest area

As of September 2010, there are 26 rest areas operating along the A1 motorway, and additional rest areas are planned along the existing sections of the route and those sections under construction. Legislation provides for four types of rest areas designated as types A through D—A-type rest areas comprise a full range of amenities including a filling station, a restaurant and a hotel or a motel; B-type rest areas have no lodging; C-type rest areas are very common and include a filling station and a café, but no restaurants or accommodation; D-type rest areas offer parking spaces only, possibly some picnicking tables and benches and restrooms. Even though the rest areas found along the A1 motorway generally follow this ranking system, there are considerable variations as some of them offer extra services. The most notable example is Krka rest area—even though it has no filling station, there is, for instance, a restaurant available. The filling stations regularly have small convenience stores and some of them offer LPG fuel. EuroTest, an international association of 18 European automobile clubs spearheaded by German automobile club ADAC, surveyed three of the A1 motorway rest areas in 2009: Krka, Lički Osik and Modruš (in case of the latter, both eastbound and westbound). All of the rest areas were rated as very good, especially in terms of facilities offered.

The primary motorway operators Hrvatske autoceste (HAC) and Autocesta Rijeka – Zagreb lease the A, B and C type rest areas to various operators through public tenders. As of September 2010, there are five such rest area operators on the A1 motorway: INA, OMV, Tifon, Petrol and Crobenz. The rest area operators are not permitted to sub-lease the fuel operations; Tifon and Petrol operated rest areas have restaurants or hotels operated by Marché, a Mövenpick Hotels & Resorts subsidiary. All of the A1 motorway rest areas, except Stupnik and Jezerane, are accessible to both directions of the motorway traffic. The rest areas normally operate 24 hours a day, 7 days a week.

List of A1 motorway rest areas
County	km	Name	Operators	Notes
City of Zagreb	1.1	Stupnik	Crodux	Facilities found at Stupnik rest area comprise a filling station selling petrol, diesel fuel and LPG, a café and restrooms. Accessible to the southbound traffic only
Zagreb County	16.9	Desinec	Petrol; Marché; McDonald's	Facilities found at Desinec rest area comprise a filling station selling petrol, diesel fuel and LPG, a restaurant, a motel, an ATM and restrooms. The motel is operated by Marché.
Karlovac	33.6	Draganić	Tifon; Marché	Facilities found at Desinec rest area comprise a filling station selling petrol, diesel fuel and LPG, a restaurant, a hotel and restrooms. The hotel and the restaurant are operated by Marché and are accessible to the southbound traffic only.
Karlovac		Vukova Gorica	INA; McDonald's	Facilities found at Vukova Gorica rest area comprise a filling station selling petrol, diesel fuel and LPG, a restaurant, a motel and restrooms.
Karlovac	78.4	Dobra	Tifon; Marché	Facilities found at Dobra rest area comprise a filling station selling petrol, diesel fuel and LPG, a restaurant, an ATM, showers and restrooms. The hotel and the restaurant are operated by Marché.
Karlovac	100.6	Modruš	HAC	Facilities found at Modruš rest area comprise picnicking tables and restrooms.
Lika-Senj	109.2	Jezerane	HAC	Facilities found at Jezerane rest area comprise picnicking tables and restrooms. Accessible to the southbound traffic only
Lika-Senj	119.0	Sokolac	INA	Facilities found at Brinje rest area comprise a filling station selling petrol and diesel fuel, a café and restrooms.
Lika-Senj	134.1	Brloška Dubrava	HAC	Parking area only
Lika-Senj	152.9	Ličko Lešće	HAC	Parking area only
Lika-Senj	159.8	Janjče	Crodux	Facilities found at Janjče rest area comprise a filling station selling petrol and diesel fuel, a restaurant, a café and restrooms.
Lika-Senj	175.0	Lički Osik	HAC	Facilities found at Lički Osik rest area comprise picnicking tables and restrooms.
Lika-Senj	191.5	Jadova	HAC	Parking area only
Lika-Senj	201.1	Zir	INA; Macola	Facilities found at Zir rest area comprise a filling station selling petrol, diesel fuel and LPG, a café and restrooms. The facilities additionally available to the southbound traffic only are a restaurant and a motel.
Zadar	227.9	Marune	HAC	Parking area only. Other facilities at Marune rest area like the hotel, café, convenience store, picnicking tables and restrooms are closed.
Zadar	239.4	Jasenice	Tifon; Marché	Facilities found at Desinec rest area comprise a filling station selling petrol, diesel fuel and LPG, a restaurant, showers and restrooms. The restaurant is operated by Marché.
Zadar	271.0	Nadin	Crodux	Facilities found at Nadin rest area comprise a filling station selling petrol and diesel fuel, a restaurant, a café and restrooms.
Zadar	292.0	Pristeg	HAC	Parking area only
Šibenik-Knin	306.6	Prokljan	INA	Facilities found at Prokljan rest area comprise a filling station selling petrol and diesel fuel, a café and restrooms.
Šibenik-Knin	315.0	Krka	HAC; Krka Commerce	Facilities found at Krka rest area comprise an a la carte restaurant, a café, a convenience store, picnicking tables and restrooms.
Šibenik-Knin	332.0	Vrpolje Primošten	Crobenz	Facilities found at Vrpolje rest area comprise a filling station selling petrol and diesel fuel, a restaurant, a café, an ATM and restrooms.
Split-Dalmatia	343.5	Sitno	HAC	Parking area only
Split-Dalmatia	356.3	Radošić	HAC	Parking area only; Accessible to both southbound and northbound traffic
Split-Dalmatia	369.6	Kozjak	INA	Facilities found at Kozjak rest area comprise a filling station selling petrol, diesel fuel and LPG, a café and restrooms.
Split-Dalmatia	392.6	Mosor	Petrol	Facilities found at Mosor rest area comprise a filling station selling petrol and diesel fuel, a café and restrooms.
Split-Dalmatia	440.9	Rašćane Gornje	INA	Facilities found at Rašćane Gornje rest area comprise parking areas and restrooms only.
Split-Dalmatia	469.2	Dusina	HAC	Parking area only
1.000 mi = 1.609 km; 1.000 km = 0.621 mi: Incomplete access

== Exit list ==
County	km	Exit	Name	Destination	Notes
City of Zagreb	0.0	1	Lučko	A3 D1 D3 E65 E70 E71 Ž1040	Access to the A3 motorway – Zagreb bypass (E70), the A2 and A4 motorways and the city of Zagreb itself via Jadranska Avenue (Ž1040); Northbound A1 traffic defaults to six-lane Jadranska Avenue (Ž1040); The northern terminus of European routes E65/E71 concurrency.
City of Zagreb	0.6	Toll plaza symbol	Lučko toll plaza		Lučko mainline toll plaza, serving both southbound and northbound traffic; The plaza accepts cash only, while drivers using ETC or credit/debit card payment methods must exit the motorway via Demerje toll plaza.
City of Zagreb	1.1	Parking area traffic sign	Stupnik rest area		Accessible to the southbound traffic only
City of Zagreb	3.6	Toll plaza symbol	Demerje toll plaza		Demerje mainline toll plaza access fork, accessible to northbound traffic only; The plaza accepts cashless payments only, while drivers using cash payment methods must exit the motorway via Lučko toll plaza. The traffic using this exit proceeds north along a three lane access road parallel to the main A1 route and rejoins it immediately to the north of Lučko toll plaza.
Zagreb County	14.2	2	Donja Zdenčina	Ž3106	Connection to Klinča Sela; The D36 state road is planned to be rerouted to this interchange.
Zagreb County	16.9	Parking area traffic sign	Desinec rest area		
Zagreb County	20.0	3	Jastrebarsko	D310	Trumpet interchange providing access to Jastrebarsko
Karlovac	33.6	Parking area traffic sign	Draganić		
Karlovac	38.6	4	Karlovac	D1 D3 D36 E71	Access to Karlovac via the D1/D3 (E71 concurrent at the junction); Access to Plitvice Lakes National Park. An at-grade intersection is located just outside the toll plaza providing access to the D36 state road. The southern terminus of the European route E71 concurrency.
Karlovac		Drežnik Viaduct			
Karlovac		Dobra Bridge			
Karlovac	50.0	5	Novigrad	D6	Access to Netretić and Jurovski Brod border crossing to Slovenia
Karlovac		Parking area traffic sign	Vukova Gorica rest area		
Karlovac	62.9	6	Bosiljevo 1	D204	Access to Bosiljevo, Bosanci (D3) and Pribanjci border crossing to Slovenia
Karlovac	66.8	7	Bosiljevo 2	A6 E65	Limited access trumpet interchange, providing access to the A6 motorway (E65) to Rijeka; The first intermediate terminus of the European route E65 concurrency—the route north of this interchange is concurrent with the E65.
Karlovac	78.4	Parking area traffic sign	Dobra rest area		
Karlovac	86.8	8	Ogulin	D42	Connection to Ogulin, Oštarije and Josipdol, Klek Mountain and Bjelolasica sports centre
Karlovac		Miljanica Bridge			
Karlovac		Modruš 1 Viaduct			
Karlovac	100.6	Parking area traffic sign	Modruš rest area		
Karlovac / Lika-Senj		Mala Kapela Tunnel			
Lika-Senj	109.2	Parking area traffic sign	Jezerane rest area		Accessible to the southbound traffic only
Lika-Senj		Mokro Polje Viaduct			
Lika-Senj		Jezerane Viaduct			
Lika-Senj	115.2	9	Brinje	D23	Connection to Brinje and Križpolje
Lika-Senj	119.0	Parking area traffic sign	Sokolac rest area		
Lika-Senj		Brinje Tunnel			
Lika-Senj	124.9	10	Žuta Lokva	A7 D23 E65	A very short stretch of the A7 is in place at this interchange. Motorway exit (and present A7 section) terminates in a junction with the D23 after approximately 1 kilometer (0.62 mi), just 300 meters (980 ft) to the north of junction of the D23 and D50 state roads. Provides connection to Senj, the D8 state road and island of Rab (to the west).
Lika-Senj	134.1	Parking area traffic sign	Brloška Dubrava rest area		
Lika-Senj	137.8	11	Otočac	D50	Connection to Otočac, Plitvice Lakes National Park, Sjeverni Velebit National Park and Velebit Nature Park
Lika-Senj		Gacka Bridge			
Lika-Senj		Plasina Tunnel			
Lika-Senj		Grič Tunnel			
Lika-Senj	152.9	Parking area traffic sign	Ličko Lešće rest area		
Lika-Senj	159.8	Parking area traffic sign	Janjče rest area		
Lika-Senj	169.7	12	Perušić	Ž5155	Connection to Perušić (D50)
Lika-Senj	175.0	Parking area traffic sign	Lički Osik rest area		
Lika-Senj	181.0	13	Gospić	D534	Provides access to Gospić, Lički Osik, Karlobag and Korenica via the D25 and D50 state roads
Lika-Senj	191.5	Parking area traffic sign	Jadova rest area		
Lika-Senj	201.1	Parking area traffic sign	Zir rest area		
Lika-Senj	204.0	14	Gornja Ploča	D522	Connection to Udbina (D1) and Plitvice Lakes National Park
Lika-Senj	209.6	15	Sveti Rok	D50	Connection to Gračac and Medak
Lika-Senj / Zadar		Sveti Rok Tunnel			
Zadar	227.9	Parking area traffic sign	Marune rest area		
Zadar	239.4	Parking area traffic sign	Jasenice rest area		
Zadar	242.4	16	Rovanjska	D8	Connection to Starigrad, Karlobag, Posedarje, Obrovac and Paklenica National Park
Zadar		Maslenica Bridge			
Zadar	249.6	17	Posedarje	D106	Connection to Pag Island and Posedarje (D8)
Zadar	253.4	18	Zadar centar	D8	Access to Zadar (north) via Zagrebačka street; also serving Nin, Vir and Pag
Zadar	262.4	19	Zadar istok	D424	Connection to Zadar (south), Zadar Airport and Port of Zadar (Gaženica); Also serving Ugljan, Pašman, Žut, Dugi otok, Telašćica Nature Park and Sukošan
Zadar	271.0	Parking area traffic sign	Nadin rest area		
Zadar	278.7	20	Benkovac	D27 D503	Connection to Biograd na moru, Benkovac, Kornati National Park, Lake Vrana Nature Park, Sveti Filip i Jakov and Pakoštane; A motorway interchange connector road links both to the D27 and D503 roads.
Zadar	292.0	Parking area traffic sign	Pristeg rest area		
Šibenik-Knin	300.1	21	Vodice	D59	Connection to Vodice, Kornati National Park, Pirovac and Murter Island
Šibenik-Knin	306.6	Parking area traffic sign	Prokljan rest area		
Šibenik-Knin	310.1	22	Skradin	D56	Connection to Krka National Park, Skradin, Visovac Island and to Piramatovci (D59) to the north
Šibenik-Knin		Krka Bridge			
Šibenik-Knin	315.0	Parking area traffic sign	Krka rest area		
Šibenik-Knin	319.1	23	Šibenik	D33	A connection to Šibenik (D8) to the south and Drniš and Knin to the north; Also serving Prvić, Zlarin, Žirje, Kaprije and Obonjan islands
Šibenik-Knin	326.5	24	Šibenik-podi		Connection to PODI - Industrijska zona; Opened in April 2024
Šibenik-Knin		Dabar Bridge			
Šibenik-Knin	332.0	Parking area traffic sign	Vrpolje Primošten rest area		
Šibenik-Knin	333.7	25	Danilo	D531	Connection to Primošten and Perković, Vrpolje
Split-Dalmatia	343.5	Parking area traffic sign	Sitno rest area		
Split-Dalmatia	351.0	26	Prgomet	Ž6112	Connection to D8 at Plano (via Ž6091) and D58 near Prapatnice; The former facilitates a western approach to Kaštela.
Split-Dalmatia	356.3	Parking area traffic sign	Radošić rest area		
Split-Dalmatia	364.7	27	Vučevica	L67061	Serving Vučevica
Split-Dalmatia	369.6	Parking area traffic sign	Kozjak rest area		
Split-Dalmatia		Konjsko Tunnel			
Split-Dalmatia	378.4	28	Split	D1 E71	The main entrance to Dugopolje, via the D1 (E71) executed as an expressway, provides access to Split city centre and the D8 state route
Split-Dalmatia	390.2	29	Bisko	D220	Connection to Imotski (via D60), Trilj and Kamensko border crossing to Bosnia and Herzegovina
Split-Dalmatia		Srijane Viaduct			
Split-Dalmatia	392.6	Parking area traffic sign	Mosor rest area		
Split-Dalmatia	403.5	30	Blato na Cetini	D70	Connection to Omiš (D8) and Blato na Cetini
Split-Dalmatia	415.3	31	Šestanovac	D39	Connection to Brela (D8) to the south and to Cista Provo (D60) and Aržano to the north
Split-Dalmatia	428.5	32	Zagvozd	D76 Ž6179	Connection to D62 state road and Zagvozd via Ž6179; connection to Baška Voda (D76 state road).
Split-Dalmatia	440.9	Parking area traffic sign	Rašćane Gornje rest area		
Split-Dalmatia		33	Rašćane		Planned connection to Rašćane
Split-Dalmatia		Rašćane Viaduct			
Split-Dalmatia	455.3	34	Ravča	D62	Connection to Ravča (and Makarska via D512); Access to Biokovo Nature Park
Split-Dalmatia		Šare Viaduct			
Split-Dalmatia		Kotezi Viaduct			
Split-Dalmatia	465.1	35	Vrgorac	Ž6208	Connection to Vrgorac and D62 road via Ž6208
Split-Dalmatia	469.2	Parking area traffic sign	Dusina rest area		
Split-Dalmatia		Veliki Prolog Viaduct			
Dubrovnik-Neretva	476.3	36	Ploče interchange	D425 E65 E73; A10	Connection to Ploče and Port of Ploče to the south via D425; Metković and the Bosnia and Herzegovina border crossing to the east via A10. Southern terminus of the E65 concurrency. A further extension of the motorway to Dubrovnik is planned.
1.000 mi = 1.609 km; 1.000 km = 0.621 mi: Concurrency terminus; Incomplete access; Unopened

== See also ==
- International E-road network
- Transport in Croatia
