= Grič Tunnel (roadway) =

Road tunnel, part of the A1 motorway in Croatia

- Location of Grič Tunnel in Croatia
- Interactive map of Grič Tunnel

Overview
- Coordinates: 44°46′46″N 15°20′35″E

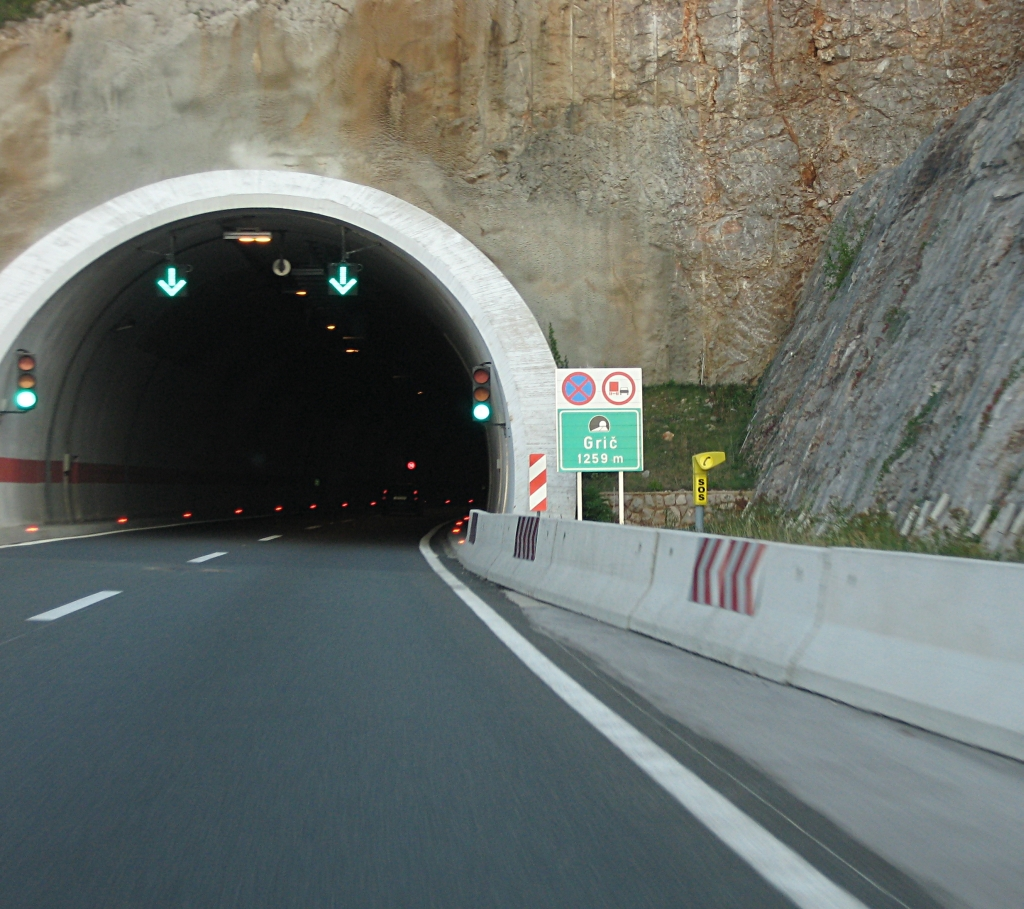
Grič Tunnel

The Grič Tunnel is a four-lane tunnel in Lika region of Croatia, an integral part of the A1 motorway located between Otočac and Ličko Lešće interchanges. The Grič Tunnel is located to the south of Plasina Tunnel. The tunnel is tolled within the A1 motorway closed toll collection system, and there are no separate toll plazas related to the tunnel use.

The tunnel consists of two tubes, excavated in 2003 and opened for traffic in 2004. Length of the northbound tunnel tube is 1,214 metres (3,983 ft), while the southbound one is 1,231 metres (4,039 ft) long. The tunnel carriageways consist of two 3.5 metres (11 ft) wide driving lanes and two 0.35 metres (1.1 ft) wide marginal strips. 0.9 metres (3.0 ft) wide inspection sidewalks are present in both of the tunnel tubes. Electronic equipment of the tunnel facilitates use of two UHF frequencies (HR1 102.3 MHz and HR2 97.5 MHz) and use of cell phones. Speed limit applied in the tunnel is 100 km/h. In 2006 the Grič Tunnel was declared to be the second safest tunnel in Europe by the EuroTAP survey run by FIA and the German motoring club ADAC.

== Traffic volume ==
Traffic is regularly counted and reported by Hrvatske autoceste, operator of the A1 motorway, and published by Hrvatske ceste. Substantial variations between annual (AADT) and summer (ASDT) traffic volumes are attributed to the fact that the motorway carries substantial tourist traffic to the Dalmatian Adriatic resorts. The traffic count is performed using analysis of toll ticket sales.

Grič Tunnel traffic volume
Road	Counting site	AADT	ASDT	Notes
A1	4216 Otočac south	11,856	28,953	Between Otočac and Perušić interchanges.

== See also ==
- A1 motorway
- Mala Kapela Tunnel
- Sveti Rok Tunnel
