= Plasina Tunnel =

Road tunnel in Croatia

- Location of Plasina Tunnel in Croatia
- Interactive map of Plasina Tunnel

Overview
- Coordinates: 44°48′56″N 15°17′5″E

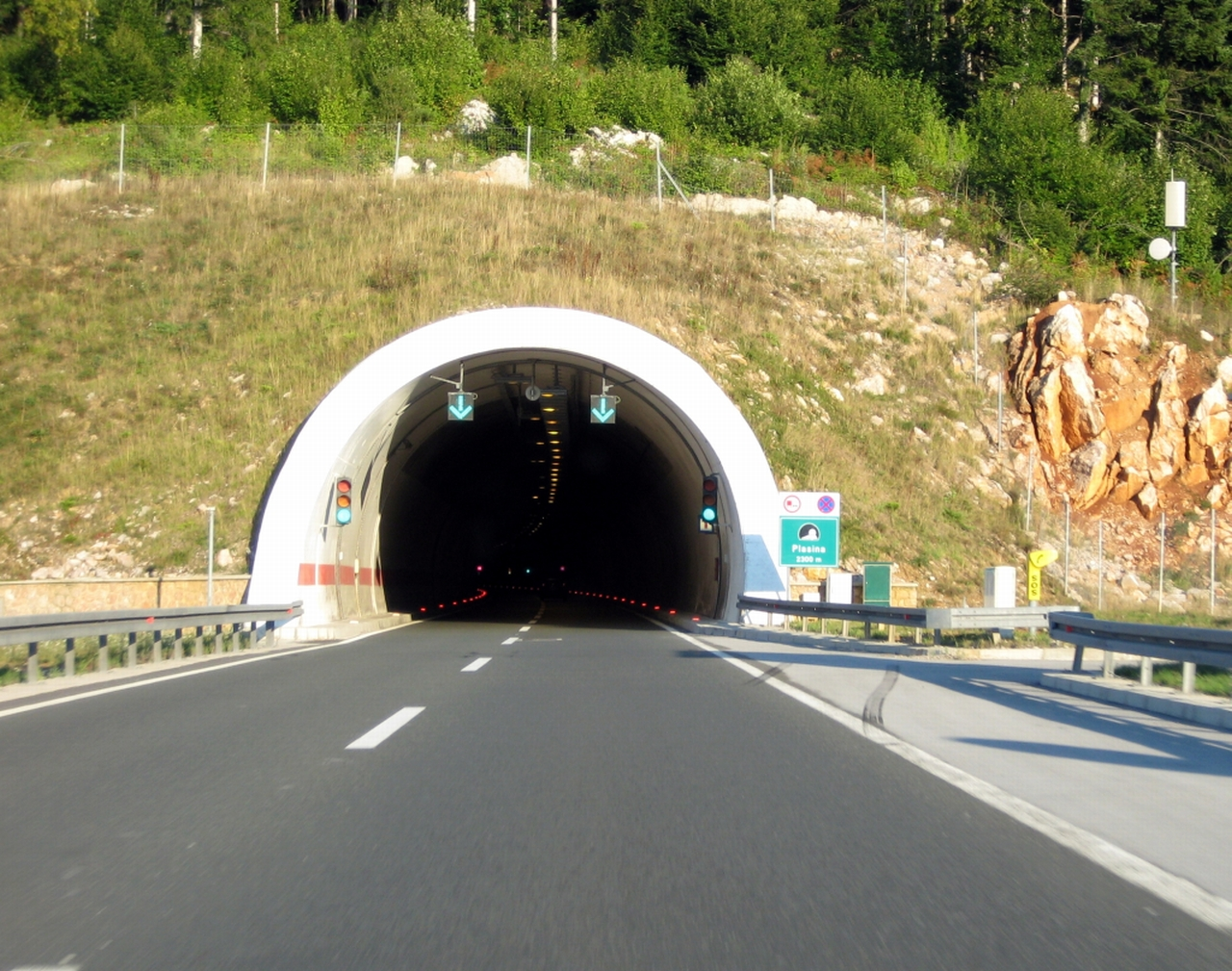
Plasina Tunnel

The Plasina Tunnel is a tunnel on the Croatian A1 motorway, located south of the Otočac interchange and north of the Ličko Lešće rest stop. The closest tunnel to the south is the Grič Tunnel.

Both tunnel tubes, 2,300 metres (7,500 ft) long, were completed simultaneously. The northern portal of the tunnel is located at 532 m.a.s.l., while the southern one is at 547 m.a.s.l. Excavation of the tunnel had been completed by January 2004. In 2006, the tunnel was declared to be among the top three safest tunnels in Europe by EuroTAP.

== Traffic volume ==
Traffic is regularly counted and reported by Hrvatske autoceste, operator of the motorway, and published by Hrvatske ceste. Substantial variations between annual (AADT) and summer (ASDT) traffic volumes are attributed to the fact that the motorway carries substantial tourist traffic to the Dalmatian Adriatic resorts. The traffic count is performed using analysis of toll ticket sales.

Plasina Tunnel traffic volume
Road	Counting site	AADT	ASDT	Notes
A1	4216 Otočac south	11,856	28,953	Between Otočac and Perušić interchanges.

== See also ==
- A1 motorway
- Sveti Rok Tunnel
- Mala Kapela Tunnel
- Hrvatske autoceste
