= Srijane Viaduct =

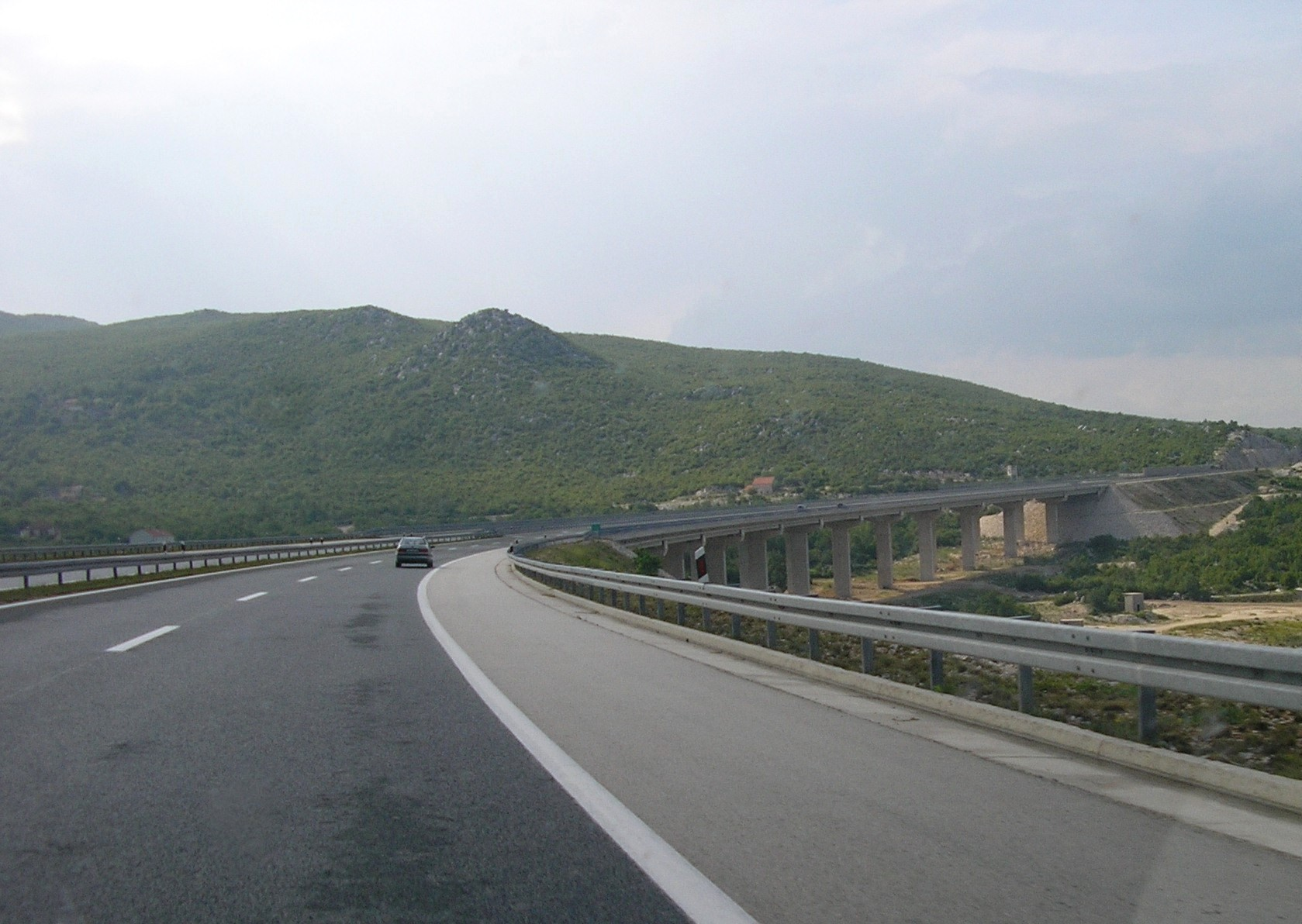
- Srijane Viaduct
- Coordinates: 43°31′02″N 16°44′18″E
- Carries: Road vehicles
- Locale: Central Croatia
- Official name: Viadukt Srijane
- Maintained by: Hrvatske autoceste

Characteristics
- Design: Plate girder bridge
- Total length: 504 m
- Longest span: 37 m

History
- Opened: 2007

Statistics
- Toll: charged as a part of A1 motorway toll

The Srijane Viaduct, also known as the Radovići Viaduct, is located between the Bisko and Blato na Cetini interchanges of the A1 motorway in Croatia. It is a 504 metres (1,654 ft) long plate girder reinforced concrete viaduct. At this location the motorway route follows a horizontal curve of 850 metres (2,790 ft) radius. The viaduct comprises 13 spans. The viaduct and its approach embankments traverse a 1,500 metres (4,900 ft) long valley. The viaduct is executed as two parallel structures, and each of the structures is 13.95 metres (45.8 ft) wide.

The viaduct was completed in 2007, and it represents the most significant structure on Dugopolje–Šestanovac section of the A1 motorway.

== Traffic volume ==
Traffic is regularly counted and reported by Hrvatske autoceste, operator of the viaduct and the A1 motorway where the structure is located, and published by Hrvatske ceste. Substantial variations between annual (AADT) and summer (ASDT) traffic volumes are attributed to the fact that the bridge carries substantial tourist traffic to the Adriatic resorts. The traffic count is performed using analysis of motorway toll ticket sales.

Srijane Viaduct traffic volume
Road	Counting site	AADT	ASDT	Notes
A1	5911 Bisko south	5,830	12,238	Between Bisko and Blato na Cetini interchanges.

== See also ==
- List of bridges by length
