= Dabar Bridge =

- Coordinates: 43.694439°N 16.030769°E
- Carries: A1 motorway
- Crosses: Dabar flash flood gully
- Locale: Southern Croatia
- Official name: Most Dabar
- Maintained by: Hrvatske autoceste

Characteristics
- Design: Girder bridge
- Total length: 354.12 m
- Width: 27.9 m
- Longest span: 50 m
- Clearance below: 60.3 m

History
- Opened: 2005

Statistics
- Toll: charged as a part of A1 motorway toll

Location
- Interactive map of Dabar Bridge

The Dabar Bridge is located between the Šibenik and Vrpolje interchanges of the A1 motorway in the Dalmatia region of Croatia. It is a 330 metres (1,080 ft) long concrete girder bridge spanning the Dabar flash flood gully at a height of 60 metres (200 ft).

The bridge is 354.12 metres (1,161.8 ft) long overall, executed across 7 spans (40 m (130 ft) + 5 x 50 m (160 ft) + 40 m (130 ft)). Axis of the bridge is in a horizontal circular curve 2,400 metres (7,900 ft) in diameter. The cross section of the bridge comprises two dilated structures, each carrying one motorway carriageway consisting of two 3.75 metres (12.3 ft) wide traffic lanes and one 2.5 metres (8 ft 2 in) wide emergency lane. The bridge is 27.9 metres (92 ft) wide overall.

== Construction ==
The deck structure consists of longitudinal girders, cross-girders, and the deck. The abutments and the outermost piers support the structure through bearings while the remaining four piers are fixed to the deck structure. The longitudinal girders are executed as prefabricated, pretensioned girders and there are 10 longitudinal girders comprising the cross-section of the bridge, i.e. five of them, with axes set 2.7 metres (8 ft 10 in) apart, supporting each of the carriageways. Length of the prefabricated girders ranges from 38.6 m (127 ft) to 39 m (128 ft) in the peripheral spans and between 48.24 m (158.3 ft) and 48.66 m (159.6 ft) in the remaining spans. The girders are 240 centimetres (94 in) high I-sections with 268 centimetres (106 in) wide upper flange. The bottom flange of the longitudinal girders is 68 centimetres (27 in) wide. The longitudinal girders were manufactured in a special plant next to the bridge construction site and placed in the bridge structure using incremental launching.

Bridge piers comprise a box cross-section measuring 5.0 m (16.4 ft) by 3.2 m (10 ft) with a constant wall thickness of 30 centimetres (12 in). The top of each of the piers is closed by an Omnia slab 15 cm (5.9 in) deep. Each motorway carriageway is supported by a separate set of piers. The abutments, on the other hand, are designed to support both of the carriageways. The cross-girders are placed at the abutments and the piers.

The Dabar Bridge was designed by Jure Radnić and constructed by Hidroelektra niskogradnja, Zagreb.

== Traffic volume ==
Traffic is regularly counted and reported by Hrvatske autoceste, operator of the bridge and the A1 motorway where the bridge is located, and published by Hrvatske ceste. Substantial variations between annual (AADT) and summer (ASDT) traffic volumes are attributed to the fact that the bridge carries substantial tourist traffic to the Dalmatian Adriatic resorts. The traffic count is performed using analysis of motorway toll ticket sales.

Dabar Bridge traffic volume
Road	Counting site	AADT	ASDT	Notes
A1	5316 Šibenik south	7,923	17,450	Between Šibenik and Vrpolje interchanges.

== See also ==
- A1 motorway
- List of arch bridges by length
- List of bridges by length
