= Konjsko Tunnel =

Tunnel in Croatia

- Location of Konjsko Tunnel in Croatia
- Interactive map of Konjsko Tunnel

Overview
- Coordinates: 43°35′45″N 16°29′18″E

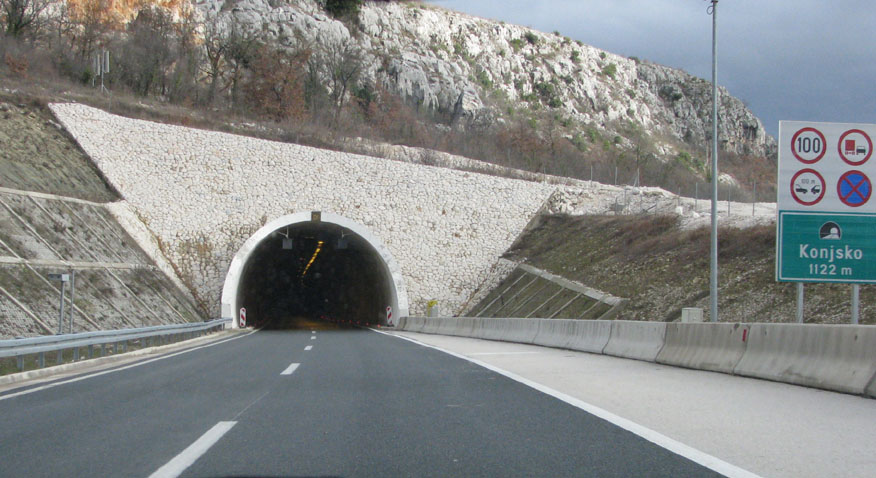
Konjsko Tunnel

The Konjsko Tunnel is located between Vučevica and Dugopolje interchanges of the A1 motorway, in the central Dalmatia region of Croatia.

The tunnel tubes vary in length, and are 1,262 metres (4,140 ft) and 1,122 metres (3,681 ft) long respectively. The tunnel tubes were completed simultaneously. Its construction has been completed in 2004. The northern portal of the tunnel is at elevation of 343.7 m.a.s.l., while the southern one is found at 338.7 m.a.s.l. The maximum permitted driving speed in the tunnel is 100 km/h.

The tunnel is operated and maintained by Hrvatske autoceste.

== Traffic volume ==
Traffic is regularly counted and reported by Hrvatske autoceste, operator of the motorway, and published by Hrvatske ceste. Substantial variations between annual (AADT) and summer (ASDT) traffic volumes are attributed to the fact that the motorway carries substantial tourist traffic to the Dalmatian Adriatic resorts. The traffic count is performed using analysis of toll ticket sales.

Konjsko Tunnel traffic volume
Road	Counting site	AADT	ASDT	Notes
A1	5417 Vučevica south	7,583	16,139	Between Vučevica and Dugopolje interchanges.

== See also ==
- A1 motorway
- Sveti Rok Tunnel
- Mala Kapela Tunnel
