= Jezerane Viaduct =

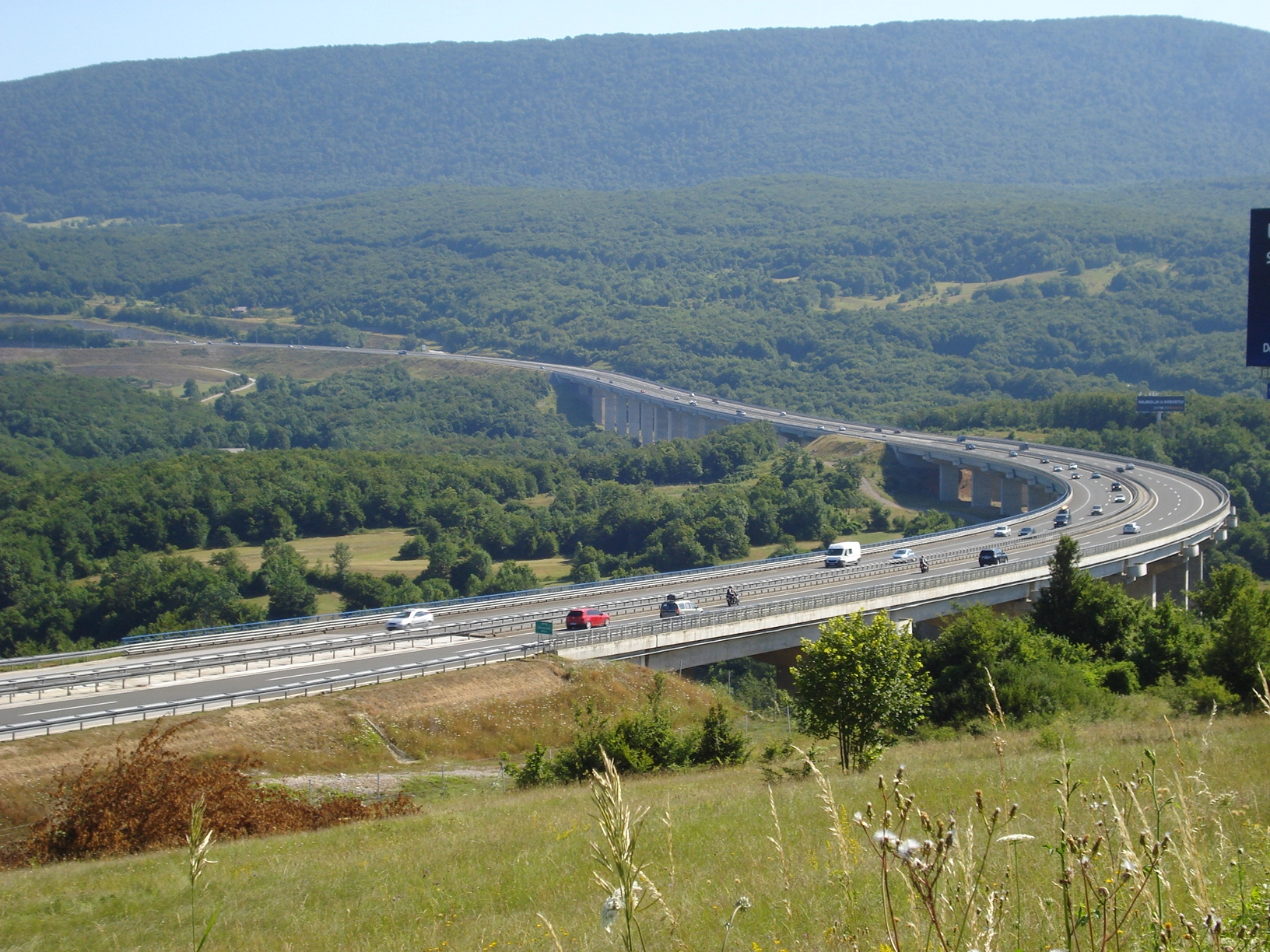
- Jezerane Viaduct, as seen from the south
- Coordinates: 45.053818°N 15.197053°E
- Carries: Road vehicles
- Locale: Central Croatia
- Official name: Viadukt Jezerane
- Maintained by: Hrvatske autoceste

Characteristics
- Design: Box girder bridge
- Total length: 661 m
- Longest span: 40 m

History
- Opened: 2004

Statistics
- Toll: charged as a part of A1 motorway toll

The Jezerane Viaduct is located between the Ogulin and Brinje interchanges of the A1 motorway in Croatia, just to the south of the Mala Kapela Tunnel. It is 661 metres (2,169 ft) long.

At this location the motorway route follows a horizontal curve of 900 metres (3,000 ft) radius. The viaduct is a beam structure across a series of spans averaging 36.1 metres (118 ft). The main span is 40 metres (130 ft) long. Due to its sheer size, the viaduct was designed in four segments comprising box girders and grillage systems and expansion joints atop three piers and both abutments. The piers comprise a box cross section, with 30 cm thick walls.

== Traffic volume ==
Traffic is regularly counted and reported by Hrvatske autoceste, operator of the viaduct and the A1 motorway where the structure is located, and published by Hrvatske ceste. Substantial variations between annual (AADT) and summer (ASDT) traffic volumes are attributed to the fact that the bridge carries substantial tourist traffic to the Adriatic resorts. The traffic count is performed using analysis of motorway toll ticket sales.

Jezerane Viaduct traffic volume
Road	Counting site	AADT	ASDT	Notes
A1	3025 Ogulin south	12,640	31,166	Between Ogulin and Brinje interchanges.

== See also ==
- List of bridges by length
