= Brinje Tunnel =

Road tunnel in Croatia

- Location of Brinje Tunnel in Croatia
- Interactive map of Brinje Tunnel

Overview
- Coordinates: 44°58′55″N 15°5′37″E

The Brinje Tunnel is a four-lane tunnel in Croatia, an integral part of the A1 motorway located between Brinje and Žuta Lokva interchanges. The Brinje Tunnel is located immediately to the south of the Mala Kapela Tunnel, the longest tunnel in Croatia.

The tunnel is tolled within the A1 motorway closed toll collection system, and there are no separate toll plazas related to the tunnel use.

== Characteristics ==
The Brinje Tunnel consists of two tubes, opened for traffic in 2004. Length of the northbound tunnel tube is 1,542 metres (5,059 ft), while the southbound one is 2 m shorter at 1,540 metres (5,050 ft). The northern portal of the tunnel is located at an elevation of 496 m.a.s.l., while its southern portal is found at 495 m.a.s.l. The tunnel carriageways consist of two 3.5 metres (11 ft) wide driving lanes and two 0.35 metres (1.1 ft) wide marginal strips. 0.9 metres (3.0 ft) wide inspection sidewalks are present in both of the tunnels.

The tunnel is equipped with the most recent traffic management and security systems, including video surveillance, automatic detection of congestion and variable information traffic sign systems. There are 3 passages connecting the two tunnel tubes, accessible on foot. Naturally, the tunnel also has firefighting capabilities and fire detection systems.

Electronic equipment of the tunnel facilitates use of two UHF frequencies (HR1 102.3 MHz and HR2 97.5 MHz) and use of cell phones.

Speed limit applied in the tunnel is 100 km/h.

== Safety ==
In 2007 the Brinje Tunnel was declared to be the safest tunnel in Europe in 2007 by the FIA and the German motoring club ADAC. The award was presented following an assessment of 150 tunnels in Europe carried out between 2005 and 2007 within the framework of European Tunnel Assessment Programme (EuroTAP), supported by the European Commission, coordinated by FIA and led by German motoring club ADAC.

== Traffic volume ==
Traffic is regularly counted and reported by Hrvatske autoceste, operator of the motorway, and published by Hrvatske ceste. Substantial variations between annual (AADT) and summer (ASDT) traffic volumes are attributed to the fact that the motorway carries substantial tourist traffic to the Dalmatian Adriatic resorts. The traffic count is performed using analysis of toll ticket sales.

Brinje Tunnel traffic volume
Road	Counting site	AADT	ASDT	Notes
A1	4214 Brinje south	12,523	31,039	Between Brinje and Žuta Lokva interchanges.

== See also ==
- A1 motorway
- Mala Kapela Tunnel
- Sveti Rok Tunnel
- List of longest tunnels
