= Krka Bridge =

Krka Bridge Most Krka
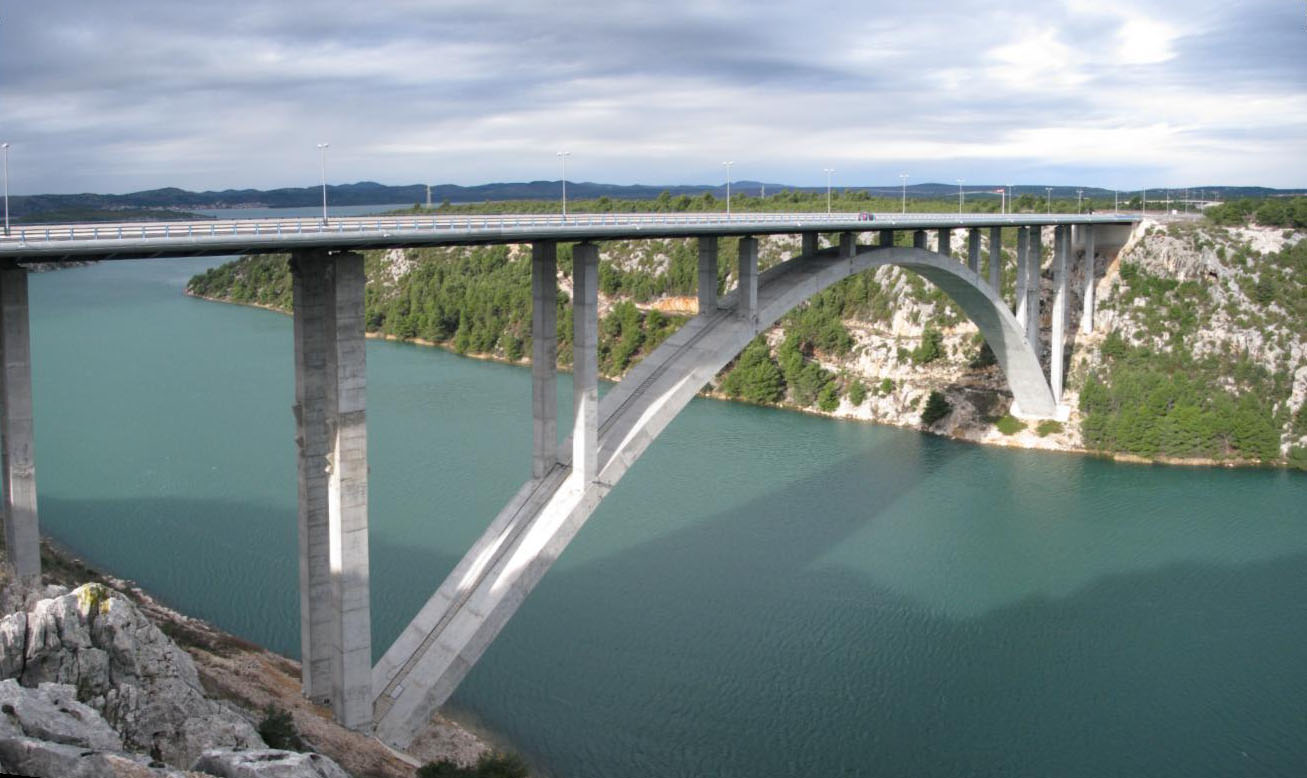
- Coordinates: 43.808°N 15.915°E
- Carries: A1 motorway
- Crosses: Krka River
- Locale: Southern Croatia
- Maintained by: Hrvatske autoceste

Characteristics
- Design: concrete arch bridge
- Total length: 391.16 m
- Width: 22.56 m
- Longest span: 204 m
- Clearance below: 65 m

History
- Opened: 2005

Statistics
- Toll: charged as a part of A1 motorway toll

Location
- Interactive map of Krka Bridge

The Krka Bridge (Croatian: most Krka) is located in Croatia, between the Skradin and Šibenik interchanges. It is a 391 metres (1,283 ft) long concrete arch bridge spanning the Krka River at a height of 65 metres (213 ft). It carries the A1 motorway route south of Skradin, in the immediate vicinity of Krka National Park.

The Krka River canyon is spanned by a 204 metres (669 ft) reinforced concrete arch, with an arch rise of 52 metres (171 ft). The composite spandrel structure consists of steel girders and a reinforced concrete deck slab. The steel grillage consists of two main longitudinal girders at an axial distance of 7.6 metres (25 ft), transversal girders set 4 metres (13 ft) apart and peripheral beams. Immediately to the south of the bridge, there is the Krka rest area offering a scenic view of the bridge and the river canyon.

The construction works comprised 16,000 cubic meters of excavation, 2,000 cubic meters of embankments and backfill, 11,800 cubic meters of various types of concrete and 2,300 tons of reinforcement steel. That does not include an additional 1,700 tons of steel used for the execution of the spandrel structure.

The Krka Bridge comprises the longest span of all the bridges on the A1 motorway, as its span surpasses the Maslenica Bridge by a mere 4 m (13 ft). That makes the Krka Bridge the fourth largest concrete arch bridge in Croatia, by span size, behind two arches of the Krk Bridge - 390 m (1,280 ft) and 244 m (801 ft) long and the Šibenik Bridge (246 m (807 ft) long).

== Traffic volume ==
Traffic is regularly counted and reported by Hrvatske autoceste, operator of the bridge and the A1 motorway where the bridge is located, and published by Hrvatske ceste. Substantial variations between annual (AADT) and summer (ASDT) traffic volumes are attributed to the fact that the bridge carries substantial tourist traffic to the Dalmatian Adriatic resorts. The traffic count is performed using analysis of motorway toll ticket sales.

Krka Bridge traffic volume
Road	Counting site	AADT	ASDT	Notes
A1	5315 Skradin south	8,811	19,707	Between Skradin and Šibenik interchanges.

== See also ==
- A1 motorway
- List of arch bridges by length
- List of bridges by length
