= Gacka Bridge =

- Coordinates: 44.86323°N 15.209541°E
- Carries: A1 motorway
- Crosses: Gacka River
- Locale: Central Croatia
- Official name: Most Gacka
- Maintained by: Hrvatske autoceste

Characteristics
- Design: Girder bridge
- Total length: 466 m
- Width: 28.9 m
- Longest span: 89.5 m

History
- Opened: 2004

Statistics
- Toll: charged as a part of A1 motorway toll

The Gacka Bridge is located between Žuta Lokva and Ličko Lešće. It is 466 metres (1,529 ft) long, and it comprises four traffic lanes and two emergency lanes. Speed limit enforced on the bridge is 130 km/h. The contract value of the bridge was 94.3 million Croatian kuna (c. €12.7 million) without VAT.

The bridge spans Gacka River, one of few remaining rivers in Croatia that is considered as readily potable water, along its entire length. Therefore, environmental protection of the area is of paramount importance at the bridge, bringing about very strict environmental protection measures. One of those was a construction requirement that no section of the bridge comes in contact with the riverbed or Gacka channel. This in turn resulted in a considerable span over the channel (89.53 metres (293.7 ft)).

The span across the Gacka River was executed using incremental launching, while the span across the Gacka channel, which is the longest, was executed using free cantilevering. The bridge comprises 9 spans: 54.70 metres (179.5 ft) + 89.53 metres (293.7 ft) + 55.46 metres (182.0 ft) + 44.52 metres (146.1 ft) + 43.77 metres (143.6 ft) + 43.77 metres (143.6 ft) + 43.77 metres (143.6 ft) + 43.77 metres (143.6 ft) + 31.83 metres (104.4 ft).

Substructure of the bridge has been executed by Hidroelektra, Zagreb in 2003, while the deck structure, executed in steel, has been constructed by Đuro Đaković Montaža of Slavonski Brod by the end of 2004. The bridge is designed as two parallel structures, each carrying one carriageway of the A1 motorway. The Gacka Bridge is the only steel bridge built as a part of the motorway between Zagreb and Split. Selection of the steel structure instead of concrete one as in case of all other bridges along the motorway was made due to poor load bearing capacity of the local soil.

== Traffic volume ==
Traffic is regularly counted and reported by Croatian Motorways Ltd, operator of the bridge and the A1 motorway where the bridge is located, and published by Hrvatske Ceste. Substantial variations between annual (AADT) and summer (ASDT) traffic volumes are attributed to the fact that the bridge carries substantial tourist traffic to the Dalmatian Adriatic resorts. The traffic count is performed using analysis of motorway toll ticket sales.

Gacka Bridge traffic volume
Road	Counting site	AADT	ASDT	Notes
A1	4216 Otočac south	11,856	28,953	Between Otočac and Perušić interchanges.

== See also ==
- List of arch bridges by length
- List of bridges by length
