= D70 road =

Road in Croatia

D70 state road

Route information
- Length: 22.0 km (13.7 mi)

Major junctions
- From: D8 in Omiš
- To: A1 in Blato na Cetini interchange

Location
- Country: Croatia
- Counties: Split-Dalmatia
- Major cities: Omiš

Highway system
- Highways in Croatia

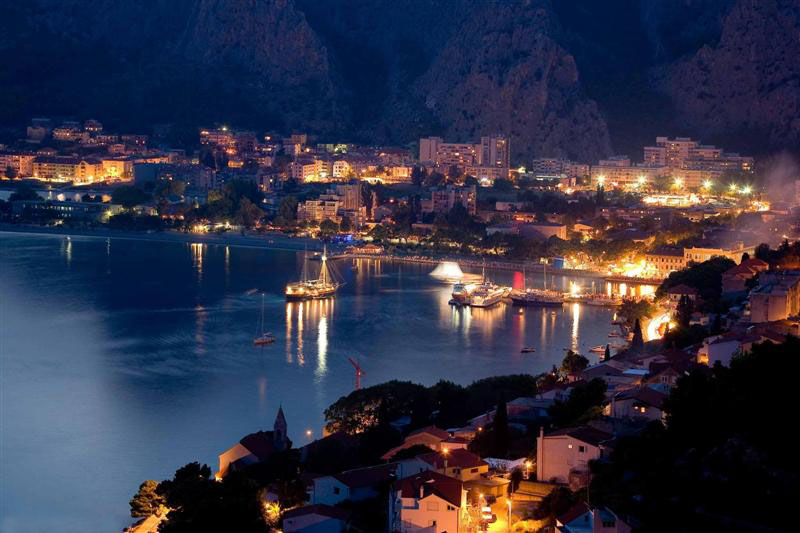
Omiš, at the southern tip of D70

D70 is a state road connecting the Omiš on the Adriatic coast the A1 motorway in Blato na Cetini interchange.

Beyond the interchange the D70 road extends as county road Ž6263 to Blato na Cetini, as the northern terminus of the road is located within the interchange itself. The road is 22.0 km (13.7 mi) long.

The road, as well as all other state roads in Croatia, is managed and maintained by Hrvatske ceste, a state-owned company.

== Traffic volume ==
The D70 state road traffic volume is not reported by Hrvatske ceste. However, they regularly count and report traffic volume on the A1 motorway Blato na Cetini interchange, which connects to the D534 road only, thus permitting the D534 road traffic volume to be accurately calculated. The report includes no information on ASDT volumes.

D70 traffic volume
Road	Counting site	AADT	ASDT	Notes
A1	Blato na Cetini interchange	126	n/a	Southbound A1 traffic leaving the motorway at the interchange.
A1	Blato na Cetini interchange	186	n/a	Southbound A1 traffic entering the motorway at the interchange.
A1	Blato na Cetini interchange	152	n/a	Northbound A1 traffic leaving the motorway at the interchange.
A1	Blato na Cetini interchange	117	n/a	Northbound A1 traffic entering the motorway at the interchange.
D70	Blato na Cetini interchange	581	n/a	Total traffic entering/leaving the A1 motorway from/to D70.

== Road junctions and populated areas ==
D70 junctions/populated areas
Type	Slip roads/Notes
	Omiš; D8 to Split and Stobreč (to the west) and to Baška Voda and Makarska (to the east). The southern terminus of the road.
	Naklice; Ž6142 to Tugare, Mravinci and Solin
	Gata; Ž6165 to Zakučac
	Čisla
	Ostrovica
	Zvečanje
	Ž6169 to Kostanje
	A1 in Blato na Cetini interchange reached via a short connector road. Connection to Split (to the north) and Ploče (to the south). Ž6263 to Blato na Cetini. The northern terminus of the road. Northbound D70 traffic defaults to Ž6263 and vice versa.
