= Rašćane Viaduct =

- Coordinates: 43.30307°N 17.190857°E
- Carries: A1 motorway
- Locale: Dalmatia
- Official name: Viadukt Rašćane
- Maintained by: Hrvatske autoceste

Characteristics
- Design: Box girder bridge
- Total length: 633 m

History
- Opened: 2008

Statistics
- Toll: charged as a part of A1 motorway toll

Rašćane Viaduct is located between the Zagvozd and Ravča interchanges of the A1 motorway in Croatia. It is 633 metres (2,077 ft) long.

Rašćane Viaduct is the most significant structure built on Zagvozd – Ravča section of the A1 motorway. The viaduct actually consists of two parallel structures, each carrying one motorway carriageway consisting of two traffic lanes and an emergency lane. Overall width of the viaduct is just under 28 metres (92 ft). The viaduct was built using incremental launching to ensure the maximum quality and the minimum damage to the environment. The speed limit enforced on the viaduct is 130 km/h.

== Traffic volume ==
Traffic is regularly counted and reported by Hrvatske autoceste, operator of the viaduct and the A1 motorway where the structure is located, and published by Hrvatske ceste. Substantial variations between annual (AADT) and summer (ASDT) traffic volumes are attributed to the fact that the bridge carries substantial tourist traffic to the Adriatic resorts. The traffic count is performed using analysis of motorway toll ticket sales.

Rašćane Viaduct traffic volume
Road	Counting site	AADT	ASDT	Notes
A1	6017 Zagvozd south	3,008	6,014	Between Zagvozd and Ravča interchanges.

== See also ==
- List of bridges by length
