= Kotezi =

Kotezi can refer to:

- Kotezi (Bugojno), a village in municipality of Bugojno, Bosnia and Herzegovina
- Kotezi (Trebinje), a village in municipality of Trebinje, Bosnia and Herzegovina
- Kotezi, Croatia, a village near Vrgorac, Croatia
- Kotezi Viaduct, a viaduct on the A1 motorway near Vrgorac
