= Šare Viaduct =

- Coordinates: 43°12′00″N 17°19′27″E
- Carries: A1 motorway
- Locale: Dalmatia
- Official name: Viadukt Šare
- Maintained by: Hrvatske autoceste

Characteristics
- Design: Box girder bridge
- Total length: 402 m
- Width: 27.9 m
- Longest span: 33 m

History
- Opened: 30 June 2011

Statistics
- Toll: charged as a part of A1 motorway toll

Šare Viaduct is located between the Ravča and Vrgorac interchanges of the A1 motorway in Croatia, opened for traffic on June 30, 2011. The viaduct actually consists of two 13.9 metres (46 ft) wide parallel structures following a 1,357 metres (4,452 ft) curve across 12 spans (26 metres (85 ft) + 10 x 33 metres (108 ft) + 26 metres (85 ft)). Each of the structures is supported by a pair of abutments and 11 H-section piers. The deck structures are executed using incremental launching and comprise a box girder of constant cross-sections each. The viaduct is 402 metres (1,319 ft) long and 27.9 metres (92 ft) wide, carrying two traffic lanes and an emergency lane for each of the driving directions.

Completion of Šare Viaduct and Vrgorac interchange were delayed due to funding problems, pushing back its completion from the originally scheduled 2009 to mid-2011. Since June 30, 2011, the viaduct is open for traffic and tolled as a part of the A1 motorway.

== See also ==
- List of bridges by length
