= Dobra Bridge (A1) =

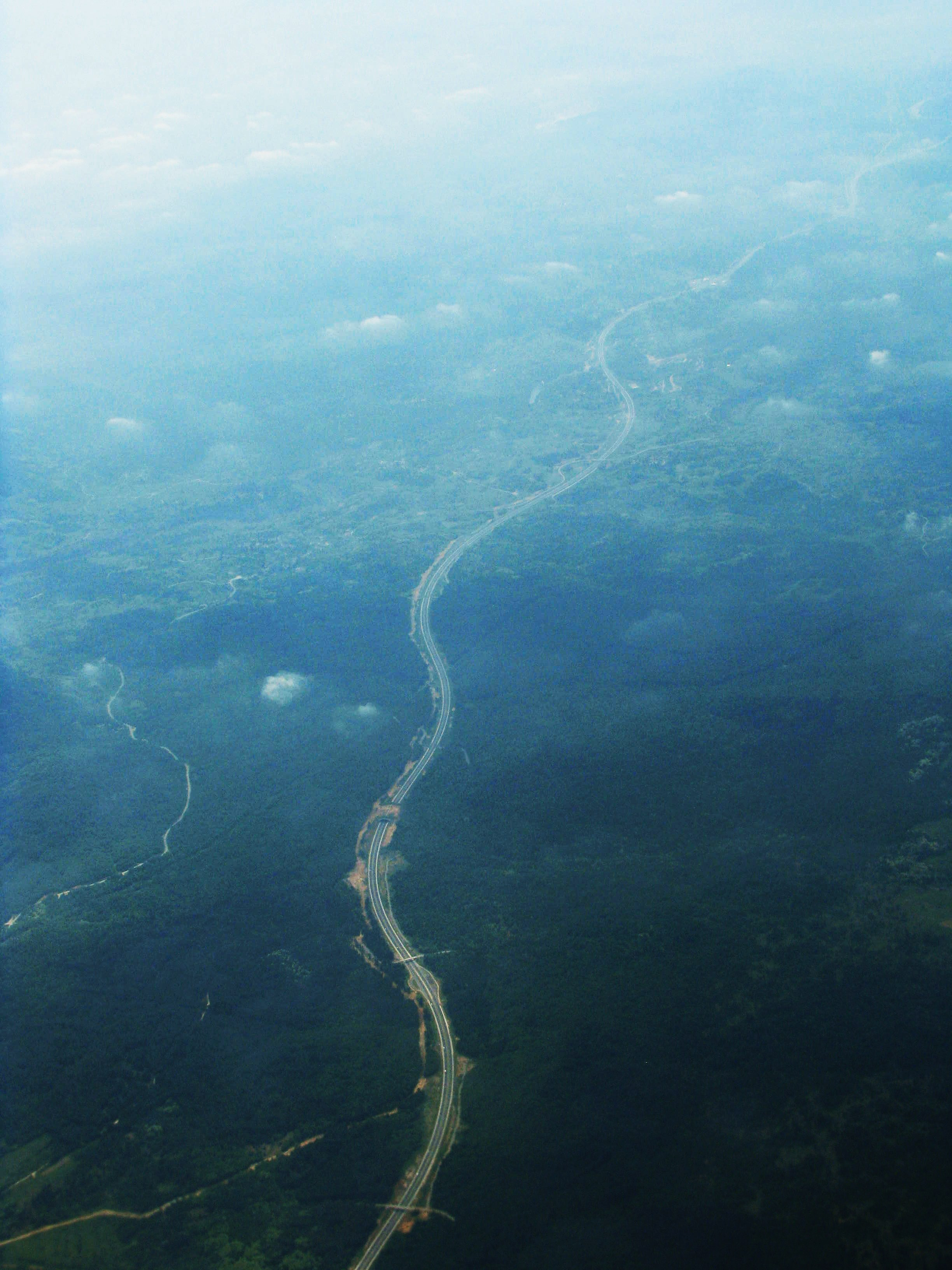
- Coordinates: 45.504903°N 15.460167°E
- Carries: A1 motorway
- Crosses: Dobra River
- Locale: Central Croatia
- Official name: Most Dobra
- Maintained by: Autocesta Rijeka – Zagreb

Characteristics
- Design: Girder bridge
- Total length: 546 m
- Width: 2 x 10.5 m
- Longest span: 70 m

History
- Opened: 2001

Statistics
- Toll: charged as a part of A1 motorway toll

The Dobra Bridge is located between Karlovac and Novigrad interchanges of the A1 motorway in Croatia, spanning Dobra River. It is 546 metres (1,791 ft) long, and it comprises four traffic lanes and two emergency lanes.

Construction work on the Dobra Bridge started in 1999 and was completed in 2001. Cost of the construction work was 57 million Croatian kuna (7.7 million euro). During the construction there was one major incident: on 1 July 2000, three girders plummeted from the main span piers into the river below. The incident did not cause any injury and damage was reported to be marginal.

== Description ==
The deck structure stretches across 13 spans. The main span is 70 metres (230 ft) long, while the remaining 12 spans are either 28 metres (92 ft) or 35 m (115 ft) long. The bridge is executed as two parallel structures, each 10.5 m (34 ft) wide. The bridge is a reinforced concrete plate gider structure, consisting of pretensioned reinforced concrete prefabricated I-section girders 180 centimetres (71 in) tall and a 22 cm (8.7 in) deep reinforced concrete deck slab. Foundations of the bridge are executed on piles.

== Traffic volume ==
Traffic is regularly counted and reported by Autocesta Rijeka – Zagreb, operator of the bridge and the part of the A1 motorway where the bridge is located, and published by Hrvatske ceste. Substantial variations between annual (AADT) and summer (ASDT) traffic volumes are attributed to the fact that the bridge carries substantial tourist traffic to the Dalmatian Adriatic resorts. The traffic count is performed using analysis of motorway toll ticket sales.

Dobra Bridge traffic volume
Road	Counting site	AADT	ASDT	Notes
A1	1804 Karlovac south	21,699	43,188	Between Karlovac and Bosiljevo 1 interchanges.

== See also ==
- List of bridges by length
