= Kotezi Viaduct =

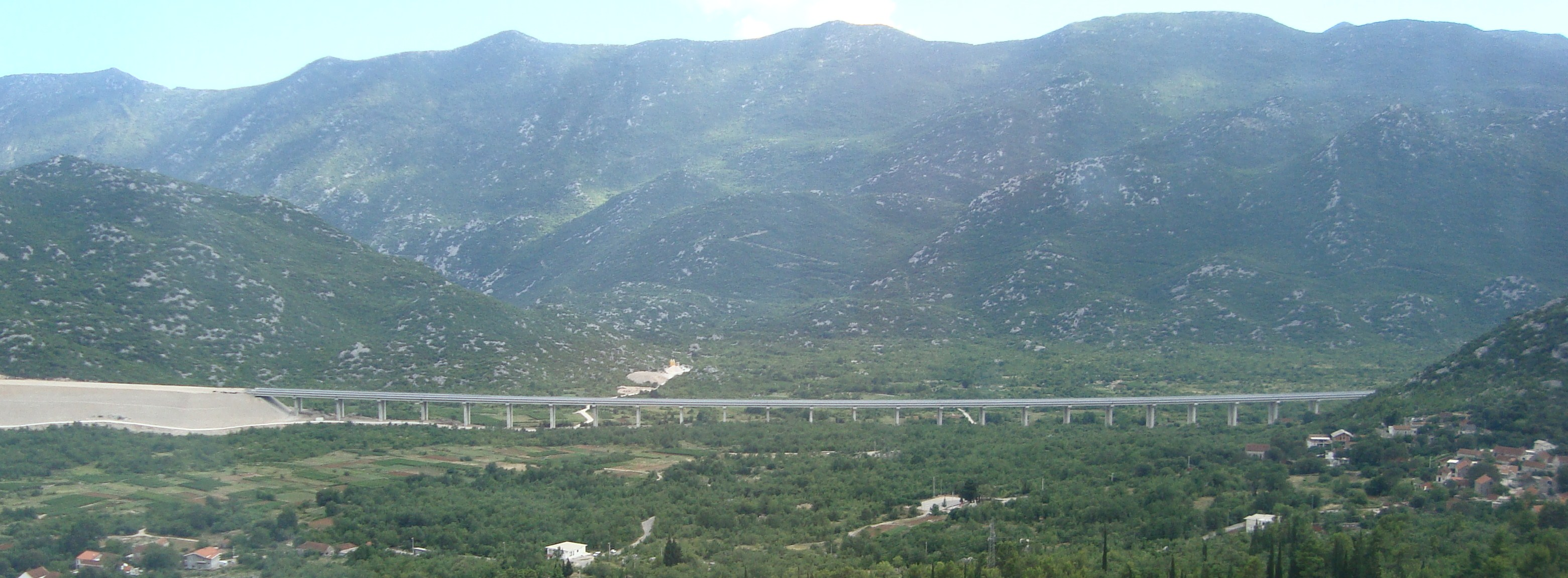
- Kotezi Viaduct during construction
- Coordinates: 43°11′37″N 17°20′42″E
- Carries: Road vehicles
- Crosses: Bunina Polje
- Locale: Southern Croatia
- Official name: Viadukt Kotezi
- Maintained by: Hrvatske autoceste

Characteristics
- Design: Girder bridge
- Total length: 1227 m
- Width: 28 m

History
- Opened: 2011

Statistics
- Toll: charged as a part of A1 motorway toll

The 1,227-metre (4,026 ft) Kotezi Viaduct is part of the A1 motorway in Croatia, located between Ravča and Vrgorac interchanges. It is the second-longest viaduct found along the motorway. Construction and opening of the motorway section and the Kotezi Viaduct was marked by a naming dispute, causing the viaduct to be renamed twice in the month before the opening. The local population expressed concerns about the viaduct's effects on the drainage of floodwater from the karst polje it spans and on groundwater levels in the area.

== Structure ==
The Kotezi Viaduct is a reinforced concrete viaduct carrying the A1 motorway in Croatia between Ravča and Vrgorac, across the Bunina Polje. It is 1,227 metres (4,026 ft) long and 28 metres (92 ft) wide, built as a dual structure, each part carrying two traffic lanes and an emergency lane. The Kotezi Viaduct is the second-longest viaduct along the A1 motorway route, surpassed only by the Drežnik Viaduct. The viaduct was built by a joint venture of DYWIDAG and Strabag but 320 prestressed beams were built in Viadukt Zagreb TBP Pojatno, and it represents the most complex structure along the Ravča–Vrgorac section of the A1 motorway.

== Naming dispute ==
Construction of the viaduct was accompanied by a naming dispute. Originally the structure was named Kotezi Viaduct, after the nearest toponym, village of Kotezi, only to be changed to Bunina Viaduct less than a month before its opening to traffic. However, only days after the decision was publicized by newspapers, Hrvatske autoceste decided to revert to the original name following protests by residents of Kotezi village. The latest change was contested by residents of Bunina village, leading to a public exchanges or arguments which name should be finally applied. Days after opening of the A1 motorway section containing the viaduct, traffic signs bearing name of the viaduct were vandalized, and newspapers speculated that the event represented a continuation of the naming dispute.

== Environmental concerns ==
Construction of the viaduct caused concern amongst the local population that an embankment used as a temporary structure during construction works would prevent drainage of water from the Bunina Polje spanned by the viaduct. The polje is regularly flooded each winter and spring due to high precipitation. Additional concerns were raised that the construction works may cause reduced yield of Betina spring and lack of flooding as was the case in 2008, when two adjacent poljes, Rastok and Jezero, were flooded unlike the Bunina Polje; any shortage of water presents a concern for agricultural production in the area. The three poljes, including Bunina, are classified as environmentally critical primarily because of improper application of fertilizers in the karst.

== See also ==
- List of bridges by length
