= Osojnik, Dubrovnik-Neretva County =

Osojnik
- Village
- Interactive map of Osojnik
- Location within Croatia
- Coordinates: 42°42′47″N 18°04′05″E
- Country: Croatia
- Region: Dalmatia
- County: Dubrovnik-Neretva County
- City: Dubrovnik

Area
  - Total: 22.4 km^{2} (8.6 sq mi)
- Elevation: 358 m (1,175 ft)

Population (2021)
  - Total: 335
  - Density: 15.0/km^{2} (38.7/sq mi)
- Time zone: UTC+1 (CET)
  - Summer (DST): UTC+2 (CEST)
- Postal code: 20236
- Area code: 020

Osojnik is a village in the Dubrovnik-Neretva County, Croatia. The settlement is administered as a part of the city of Dubrovnik.

== Demographics ==
According to the 2021 census, its population was 335. According to national census of 2001, population of the settlement was 321.
