= Demerje =

Village in Croatia

- Village
- Location within Croatia
- Coordinates: 45°43′47″N 15°53′06″E
- Country: Croatia
- County: City of Zagreb
- City District: Brezovica

Area
  - Total: 3.9 sq mi (10.2 km^{2})
- Elevation: 410 ft (125 m)

Population (2021)
  - Total: 737
  - Density: 187/sq mi (72.3/km^{2})
- Time zone: UTC+1 (CET)
  - Summer (DST): UTC+2 (CEST)
- Postal code: 10251
- Area code: 01

Demerje is a settlement within the City of Zagreb, Croatia. The settlement is administered as a part of the City of Zagreb.

== Demographics ==
According to the 2021 census, its population was 737. According to national census of 2011, population of the settlement was 721.
