= Blato na Cetini =

- Village
- Location within Split-Dalmatia County Location within Croatia
- Coordinates: 43°40′11″N 16°49′22″E
- Country: Croatia
- Region: Dalmatia
- County: Split-Dalmatia County

Area
  - Total: 20.1 km^{2} (7.8 sq mi)

Population (2021)
  - Total: 462
  - Density: 23.0/km^{2} (59.5/sq mi)
- Time zone: UTC+1 (CET)
  - Summer (DST): UTC+2 (CEST)

Blato na Cetini is a village in Split-Dalmatia County, Croatia.
