= Ličko Lešće =

Coordinates: 44°48′N 15°19′E

- Village
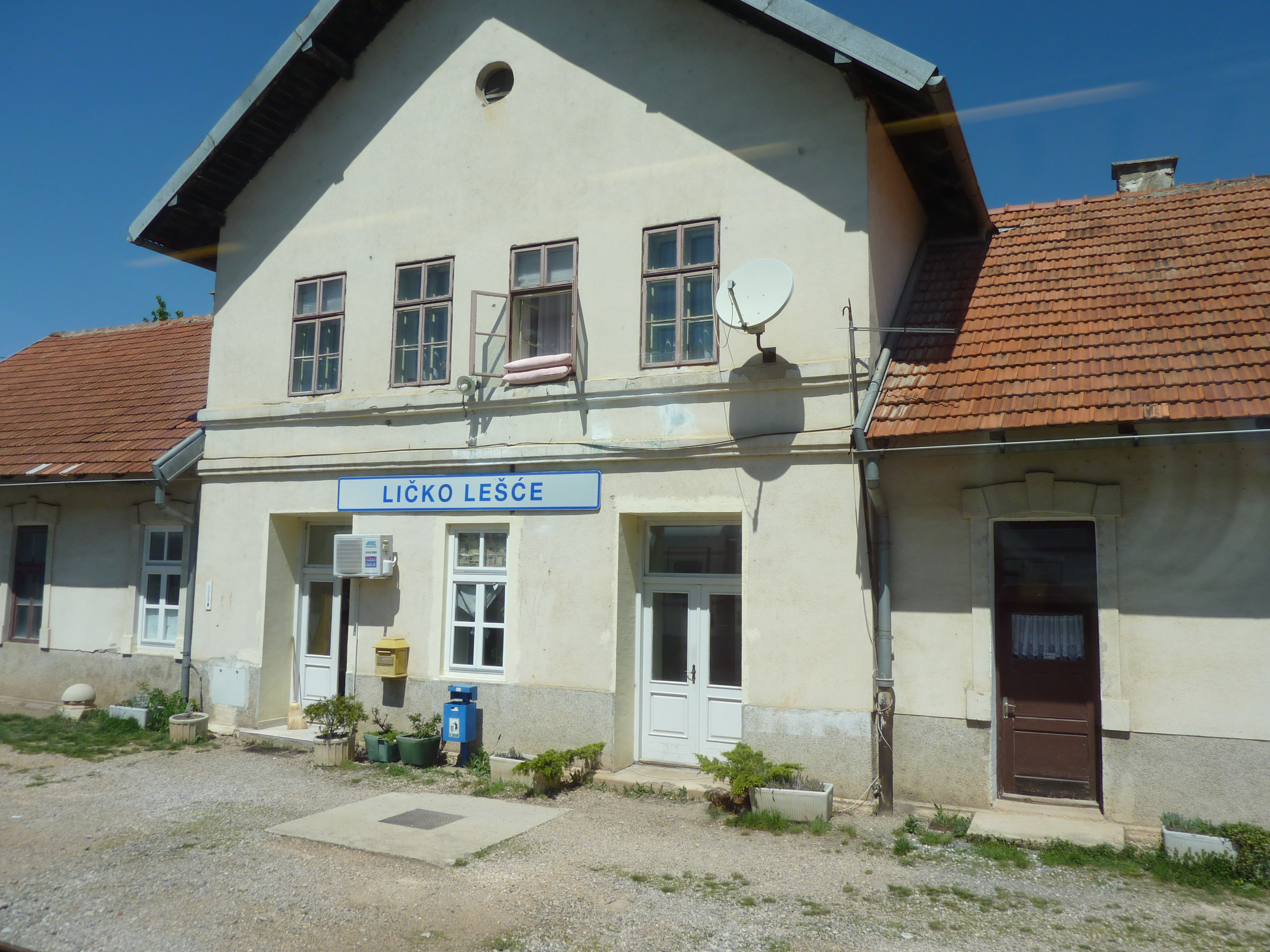
- Ličko Lešće Railway station, Croatia
- Interactive map of Ličko Lešće
- Country: Croatia
- Region: Lika
- County: Lika-Senj County
- Municipality: Otočac

Area
  - Total: 30.4 km^{2} (11.7 sq mi)

Population (2021)
  - Total: 571
  - Density: 18.8/km^{2} (48.6/sq mi)
- Time zone: UTC+1 (CET)
  - Summer (DST): UTC+2 (CEST)

Ličko Lešće is a village in Croatia. It is connected by the D50 highway.

== Climate ==
Since records began in 1960, the highest temperature recorded at the local weather station was 39.1 °C (102.4 °F), on 8 August 2013. The coldest temperature was −27.5 °C (−17.5 °F), on 13 January 2003.
