= Hrvatske ceste =

Croatian road management company

Hrvatske ceste d.o.o.
- Type: State-owned limited company
- Industry: Road transport
- Founded: 2001; 25 years ago
- Headquarters: Zagreb, Croatia
- Key people: Ivica Budimir
- Revenue: ▲€466,860,000 (2026)
- Website: www.hrvatske-ceste.hr

Hrvatske ceste (lit. 'Croatian roads') is a Croatian state-owned company pursuant to provisions of the Croatian Public Roads Act (Croatian: Zakon o javnim cestama) enacted by the Parliament of the Republic of Croatia. The tasks of the company are defined by the Public Roads Act and its Founding Declaration, the principal task being the management, construction and maintenance of public roads. In practice, Hrvatske ceste is responsible for the state roads in Croatia (designated with D), while county (Ž) and local (L) roads are managed by county authorities and the motorways (A) are managed by Hrvatske autoceste and other concessionaires.

== History ==
The company is currently administered by a four-person managing board including chairman Ivica Budimir and a three-member supervisory board.

The company was first established on 6 April 2001, under the law promulgated on 5 April 2001, with the share capital of the company worth 128,898,200.00 Croatian kuna.

Hrvatske ceste are organized in six business sectors:

- Sector for preparation, construction and reconstruction,
- Sector for maintenance and traffic,
- Sector for economic affairs,
- Sector for legal affairs, human resources affairs and general affairs,
- Sector for development and IT support.

All profits generated by Hrvatske ceste are used for construction and maintenance of the roads the company manages.

== See also ==
- State roads in Croatia
