= Hrvatske autoceste =

Hrvatske autoceste d.o.o.
- Company type: State-owned limited company
- Industry: Road transport
- Founded: 2001
- Headquarters: Zagreb, Croatia
- Key people: Boris Huzjan (Chairman of the Board)
- Revenue: ▲€415,200,000 (2026)
- Net income: ▲€68,450,000 (2026)
- Number of employees: 2,140 (2026)
- Website: www.hac.hr

Hrvatske autoceste (HAC) or Croatian Motorways Ltd is a Croatian state-owned limited liability company tasked with management, construction and maintenance of motorways in Croatia pursuant to provisions of the Croatian Public Roads Act (Croatian: Zakon o javnim cestama) enacted by the Croatian Parliament. Tasks of the company are defined by Public Roads Act and its Founding Declaration, with the principal task being the management, construction and maintenance of the motorways. In practice, Hrvatske autoceste is responsible for management or development of the following motorway sections:

Number	Control cities (or other appropriate route description)
A1	Zagreb (A3) - Karlovac - Bosiljevo (A6) - Zadar - Split - Ploče interchange (A10)
A3	Bregana border crossing - Zagreb (A1, A2, A4, A11) - Slavonski Brod - Sredanci (A5) - Županja - Lipovac - Bajakovo border crossing
A4	Ivanja Reka (A3) - Varaždin - Goričan border crossing
A5	Svilaj border crossing - Sredanci (A3) - Đakovo - Osijek - Beli Manastir - Branjin Vrh border crossing
A6	Bosiljevo (A1) - Orehovica (A7)
A7	Rupa border crossing - Matulji (A8) - Rijeka - Orehovica (A6) - Križišće
A10	Nova sela border crossing - Ploče interchange (A1)
A11	Jakuševec (A3) - Velika Gorica - Buševec - Lekenik - Sisak
D102	Krk Bridge

A8 and A9 highways, part of the "Istrian Y" are operated by BINA Istra, while A2 is operated by Autocesta Zagreb–Macelj.

"Hrvatske autoceste" was established on 6 April 2001, under the law promulgated on 5 April 2001, with the share capital of the company worth 131,140,100.00 Croatian kuna. Hrvatske autoceste is organized in four business sectors: Design; Construction; Financial and Economic Affairs; and Legal and General Affairs. All profits generated by HAC are used for construction and maintenance of the roads the company manages. As of 2026 the company is currently administered by a two-person managing board consisting of Boris Huzjan (chairman) and Luka Čirko (member of the Board); and five-member supervisory board.

== See also ==
- Highways in Croatia
- Hrvatske ceste
