= Vila Velebita =

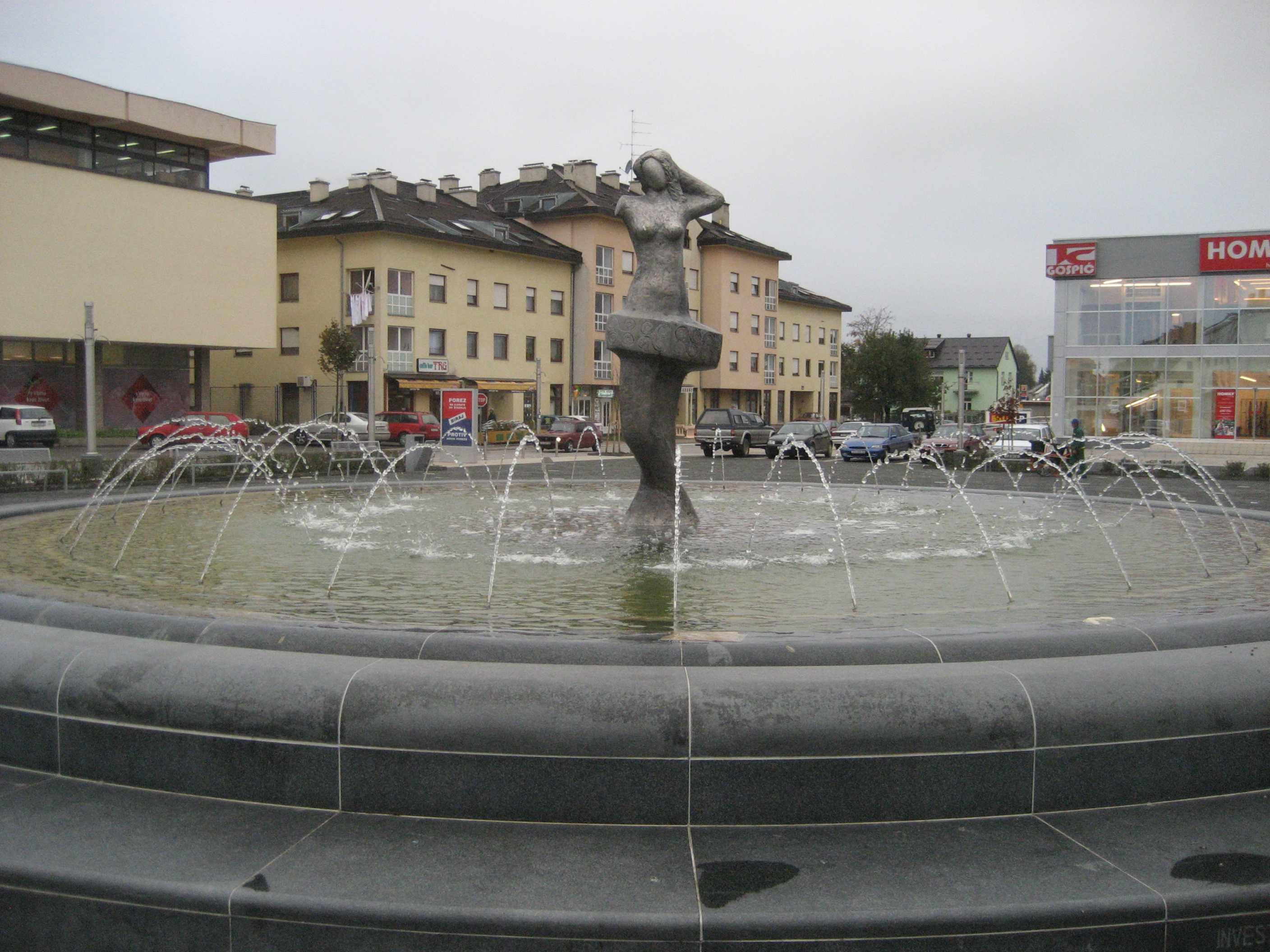

"Vila Velebita" (lit. 'Vila of Velebit', often translated as 'Fairy of Velebit') is a Croatian patriotic song. It originates from the second half of the 19th century, after the Illyrian movement. Its earliest recorded public performance was in 1882 in Zagreb, on the Croatian singing society "Kolo"'s twentieth anniversary party.

The first recording of the lyrics and the melody dates from 1893, when Vjekoslav Klaić recorded it in the Hrvatska pjesmarica (lit. Croatian Songbook). He wrote down the first verse based on Vjenceslav Novak's rendition of how the people of Senj sang it. The original author remains unknown, but it was sometimes ascribed to the poets Danilo Medić or to Lavoslav Vukelić, while some sources claim the melody was written by the composer Mijo Majer.

While vila is often translated as "fairy" (as below), vilas are supernatural beings in Slavic folklore quite different from English fairies.

== Lyrics ==
Croatian

Oj ti vilo, vilo Velebita,
Ti našeg roda diko,
Tvoja slava jeste nama sveta,
Tebi Hrvat kliko:

Ti vilo Velebita,
Ti našeg roda diko!
Živila, premila,
Živila, premila,
Živila, oj premila,
Ti vilo svih Hrvata!

Velebite, vilovito stijenje,
Ja ljubim tvoje smilje.
Ljubim tvoga u gorici vuka,
Ličkoga hajduka.

Ti vilo Velebita
Ti našeg roda diko!
Živila, premila,
Živila, premila,
Živila, oj premila,
Ti vilo svih Hrvata!

English translation

Oh fairy, fairy of Velebit,
The pride of our kin,
Your glory is holy to us,
A Croat exults to you:

Fairy of Velebit,
The pride of our kin!
Long live, most dearest,
Long live, most dearest,
Long live, oh dearest,
The fairy of all Croats!

Velebit, the rocks of fairies,
I cherish your immortelle.
I cherish the mountain wolf,
The hajduk of Lika.

Fairy of Velebit,
The pride of our kin!
Long live, most dearest,
Long live, most dearest,
Long live, oh dearest,
The fairy of all Croats!

== See also ==
- Velebitska Vila

== Sources ==
- Vladimir Jagarić: Dileme oko nastanka popijevke "Vila Velebita", Hrvatski planinar 84 (1992), p11-12
