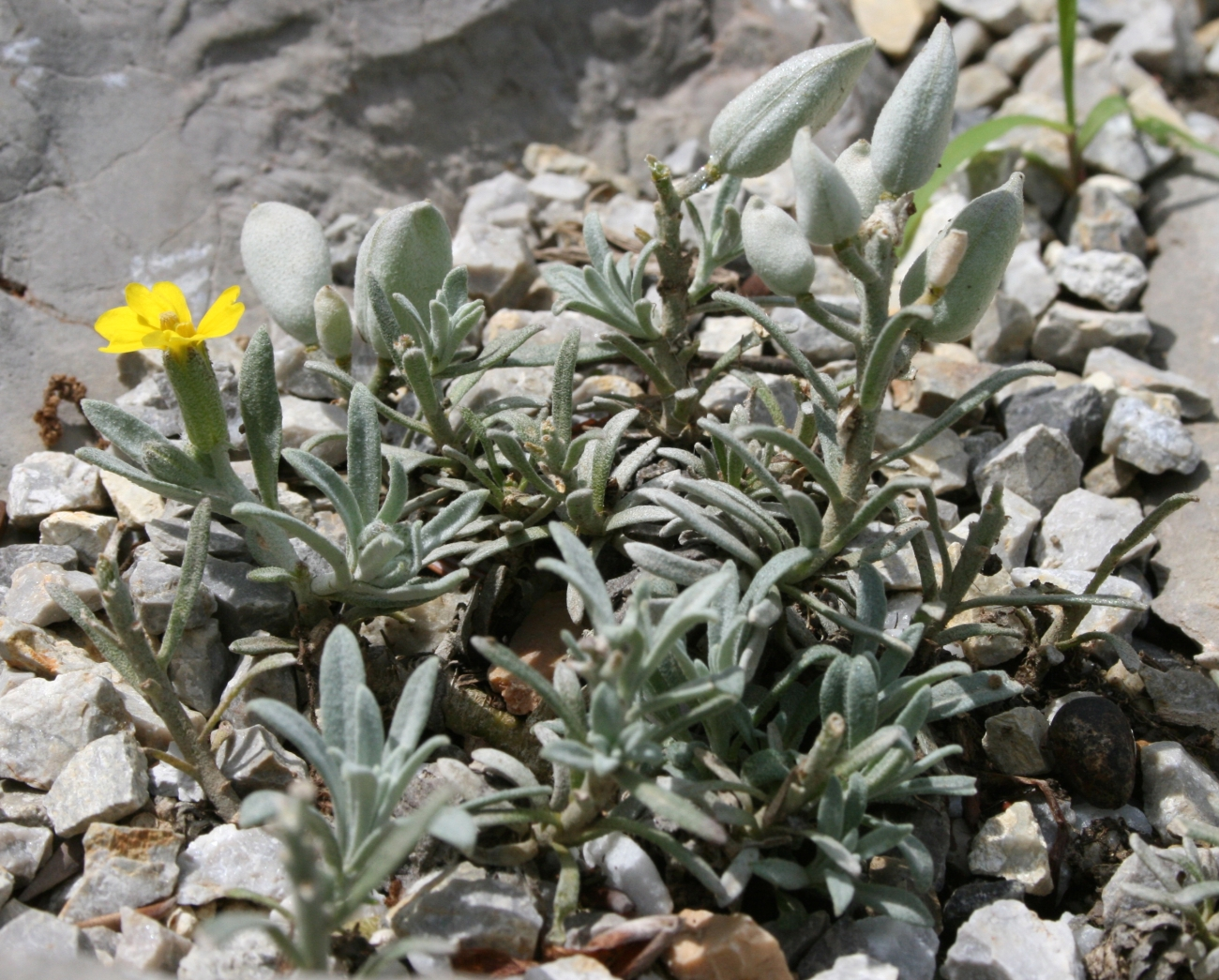
- Degenia velebitica

Scientific classification
- Kingdom: Plantae
- Clade: Tracheophytes
- Clade: Angiosperms
- Clade: Eudicots
- Clade: Rosids
- Order: Brassicales
- Family: Brassicaceae
- Genus: Degenia; Hayek
- Species: D. velebitica

Binomial name
- Degenia velebitica (Degen) Hayek

Synonyms
- Alyssum velebeticum (Degen) Degen; Lesquerella velebitica Degen (1909) (basionym)

= Degenia =

Genus of flowering plants

Degenia is a monotypic plant genus in the family Brassicaceae containing the single species Degenia velebitica. The yellow-flowered plant is endemic to the Velebit and Kapela mountain ranges of Croatia. It is an endangered species and has had protected status since 1964. It grows in open stony grasslands, settled scree slopes, and rock crevices fully exposed to sun and stormy northeasterly (Bora) winds, from 300 to 1300 meters elevation.

Discovered by Árpád Degen in 1909, the species has since become a symbol of the region. Known in Croatian by the translation of the binomial name (velebitska degenija), it was depicted on the reverse of the Croatian 50 lipa coin, minted from 1993 to 2022.

Degenia velebitica depicted on the coat of arms of the Lika-Senj County, the area it is endemic to.
