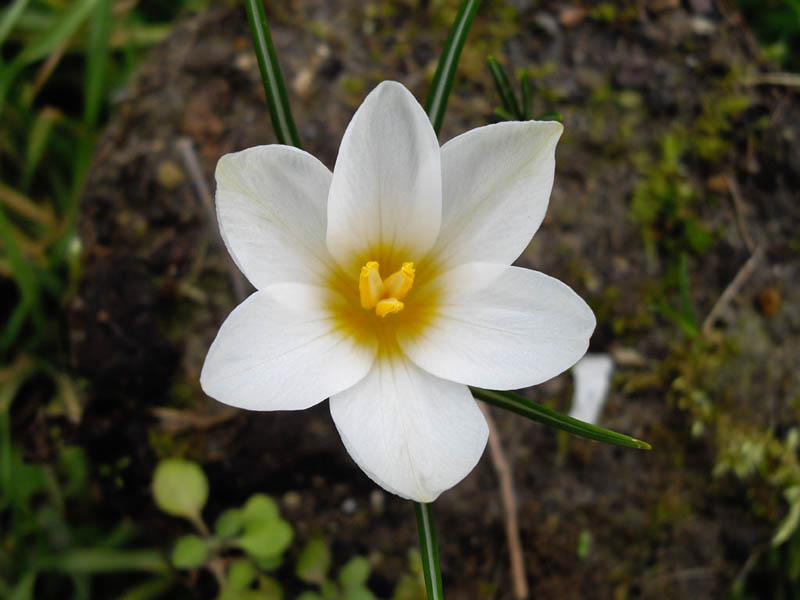

Scientific classification
- Kingdom: Plantae
- Clade: Tracheophytes
- Clade: Angiosperms
- Clade: Monocots
- Order: Asparagales
- Family: Iridaceae
- Genus: Crocus
- Species: C. malyi

Binomial name
- Crocus malyi Vis.

= Crocus malyi =

Species of flowering plant

Crocus malyi, the Maly crocus, is a species of flowering plant in the genus Crocus of the family Iridaceae. It is endemic to the Velebit mountains of southwestern Croatia.

Growing to 10 cm (3.9 in), this cormous perennial produces white flowers with a yellow throat in early spring. In cultivation, it has gained the Royal Horticultural Society's Award of Garden Merit.
