= Vaganski vrh =

Mountain in Croatia

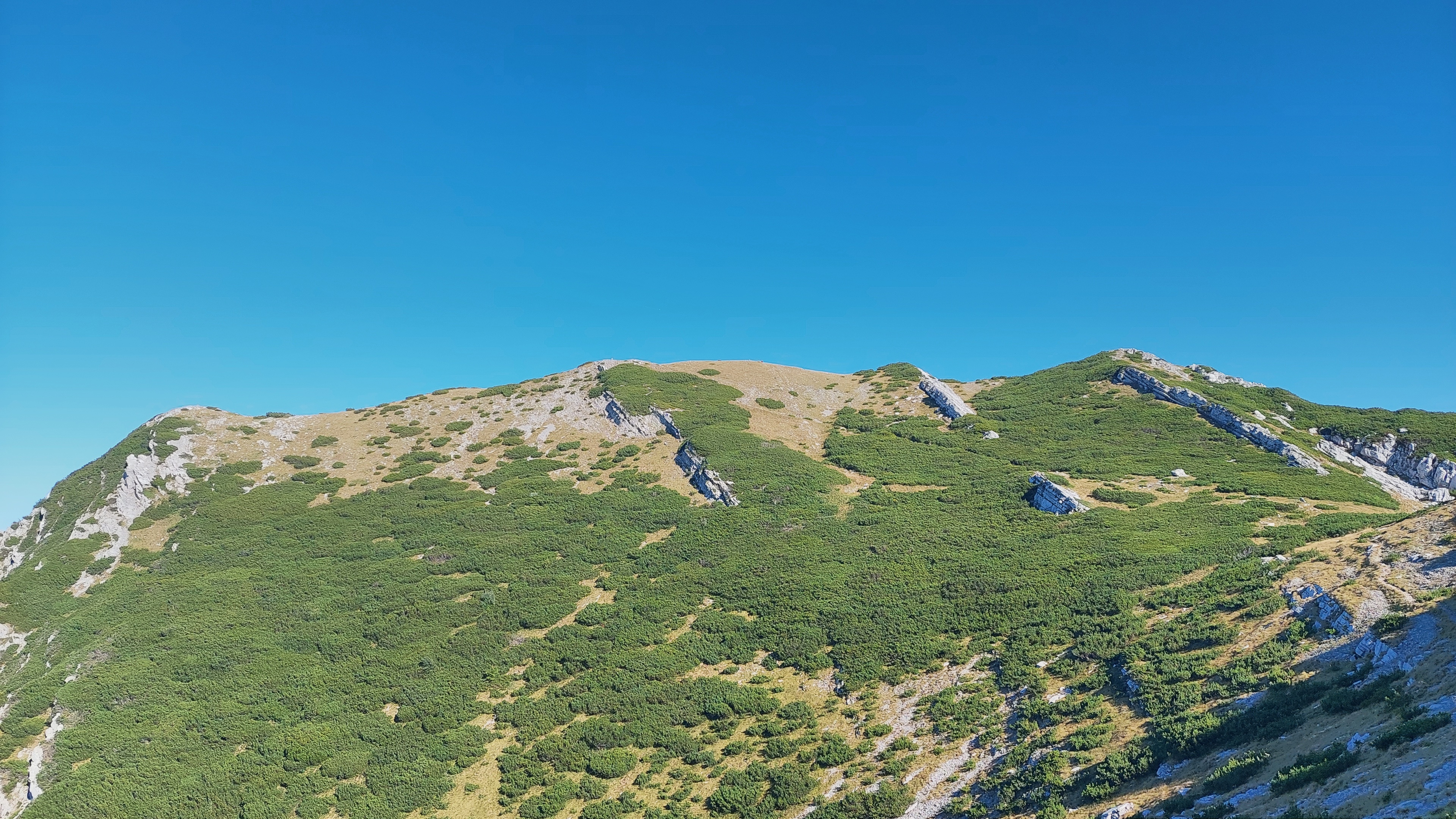
- Summit area of Vaganski vrh. The summit is the grass area in the middle of the photo.

Highest point
- Elevation: 1,758 m/nv (5,768 ft)
- Prominence: 1,083 m (3,553 ft)
- Parent peak: Dinara (line parent)
- Isolation: 61.9 km (38.5 mi) to Velika Osječenica
- Coordinates: 44°22′02″N 15°30′16″E

Geography
- Location within Croatia
- Location: Lika-Senj County, Croatia
- Parent range: Velebit, Dinaric Alps

Vaganski vrh, at 1,758 m (5,768 ft) above the Adriatic, is the highest mountain of the Velebit mountain range in Croatia.

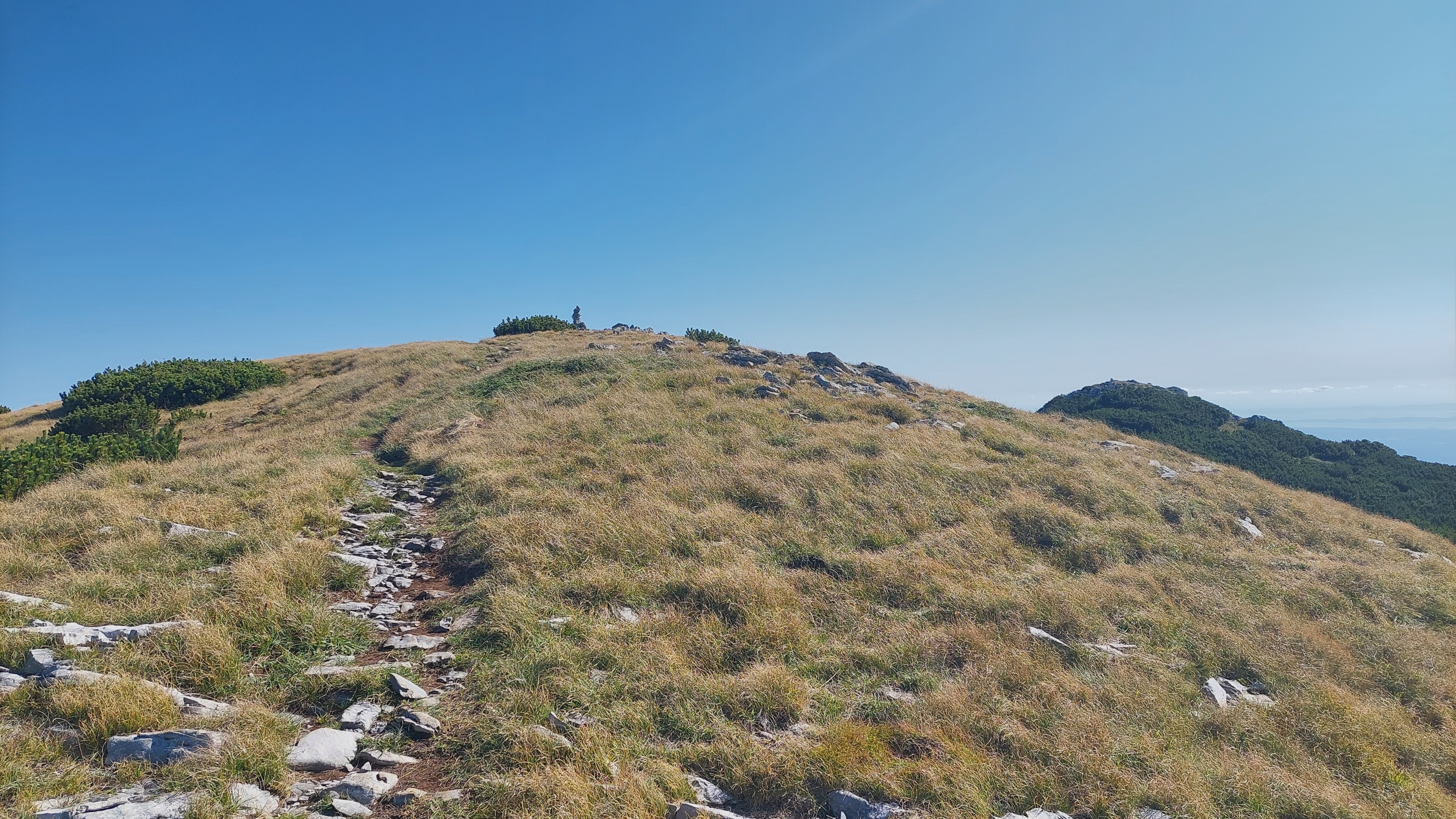
Summit of Vaganski vrh.

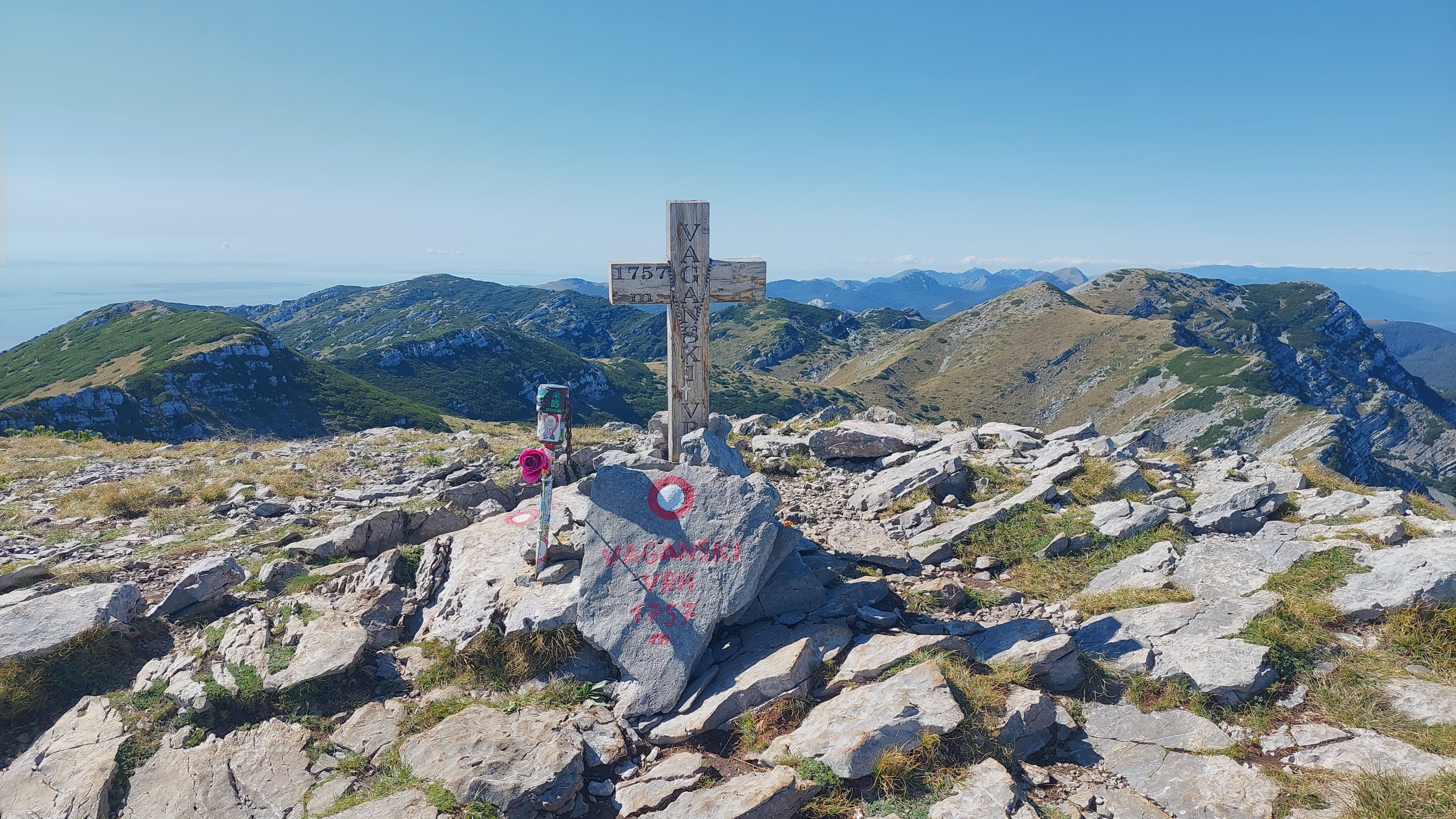
Summit cross of Vaganski vrh, which is located north of the summit.

== Location ==
Its summit is located in Gospić, Lika-Senj County, and part of the national park of Paklenica.

== Climbing routes ==
With the summit being located in the national park of Paklenica, access to it is subject to the park's admission charge.

The summit can be reached from the coastal village of Starigrad via the canyon Velika Paklenica and the Paklenica mountain hut (Planinarski dom Paklenica), which is located at the upper end of the canyon at 480 m (1,575 ft) above the Adriatic. Having passed the hut, the further ascent via the marked mountain path Lipa staza is steep. Where the mountainside is wooded, the path may be slippery if the ground is moist. Above the tree line and prior to reaching the ridge that leads towards the summit, a narrow and steep scree field has to be overcome. Having reached the ridge, the final approach is not challenging.

Alternatively, the summit can be reached via the mountain path Bukova staza, which is also marked and branches off to the north at the beginning of Lipa staza, about 300 m (984 ft) north of Paklenica hut. This path is less steep and slippery. However, it is longer and crosses karst areas with sharp rock.

The foot approach from Starigrad can be shortened by about 2 km (1 mi) using the parking space inside the national park of Paklenica for an additional admission charge.

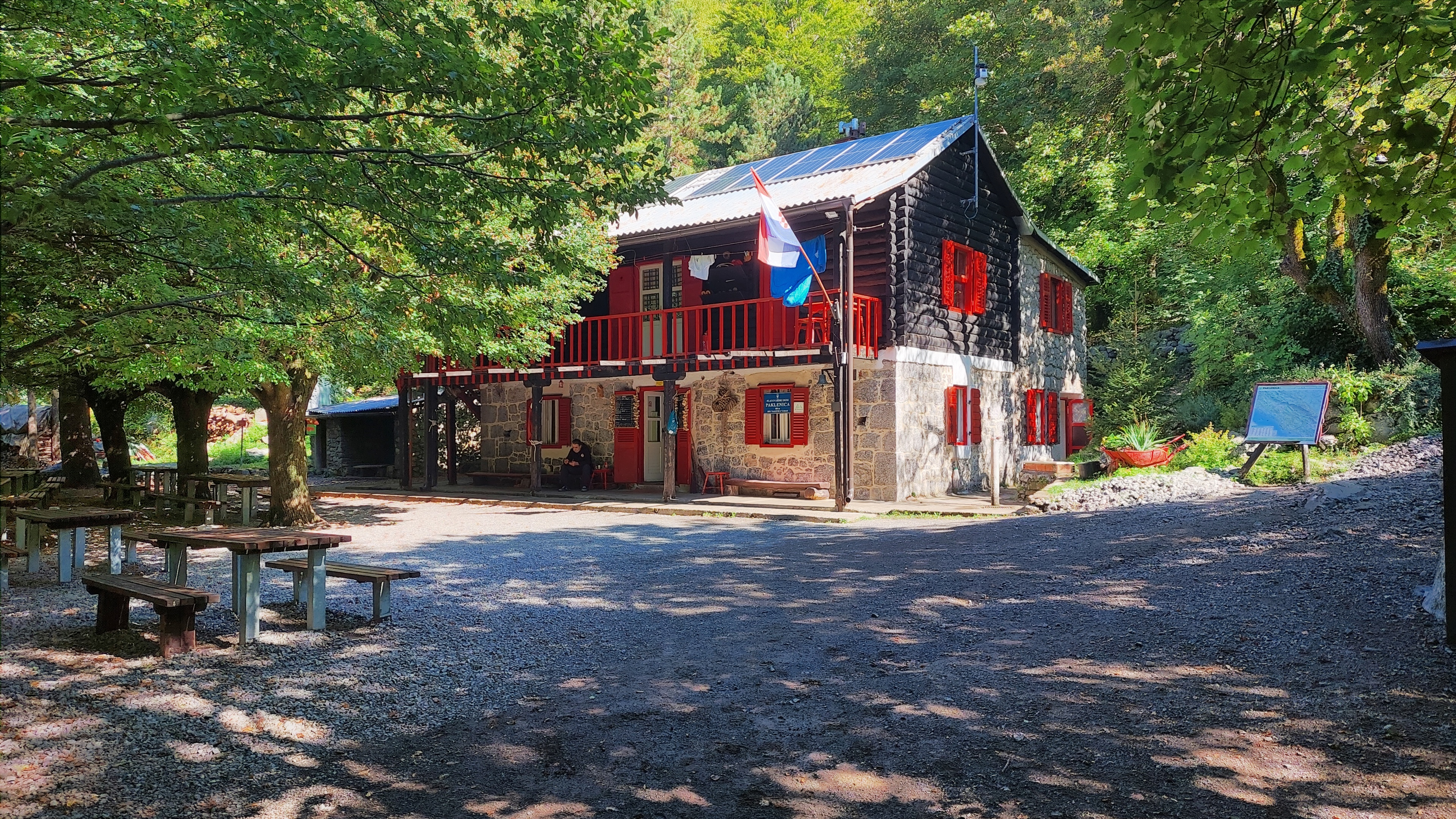
Mountain hut Planinarski dom Paklenica.

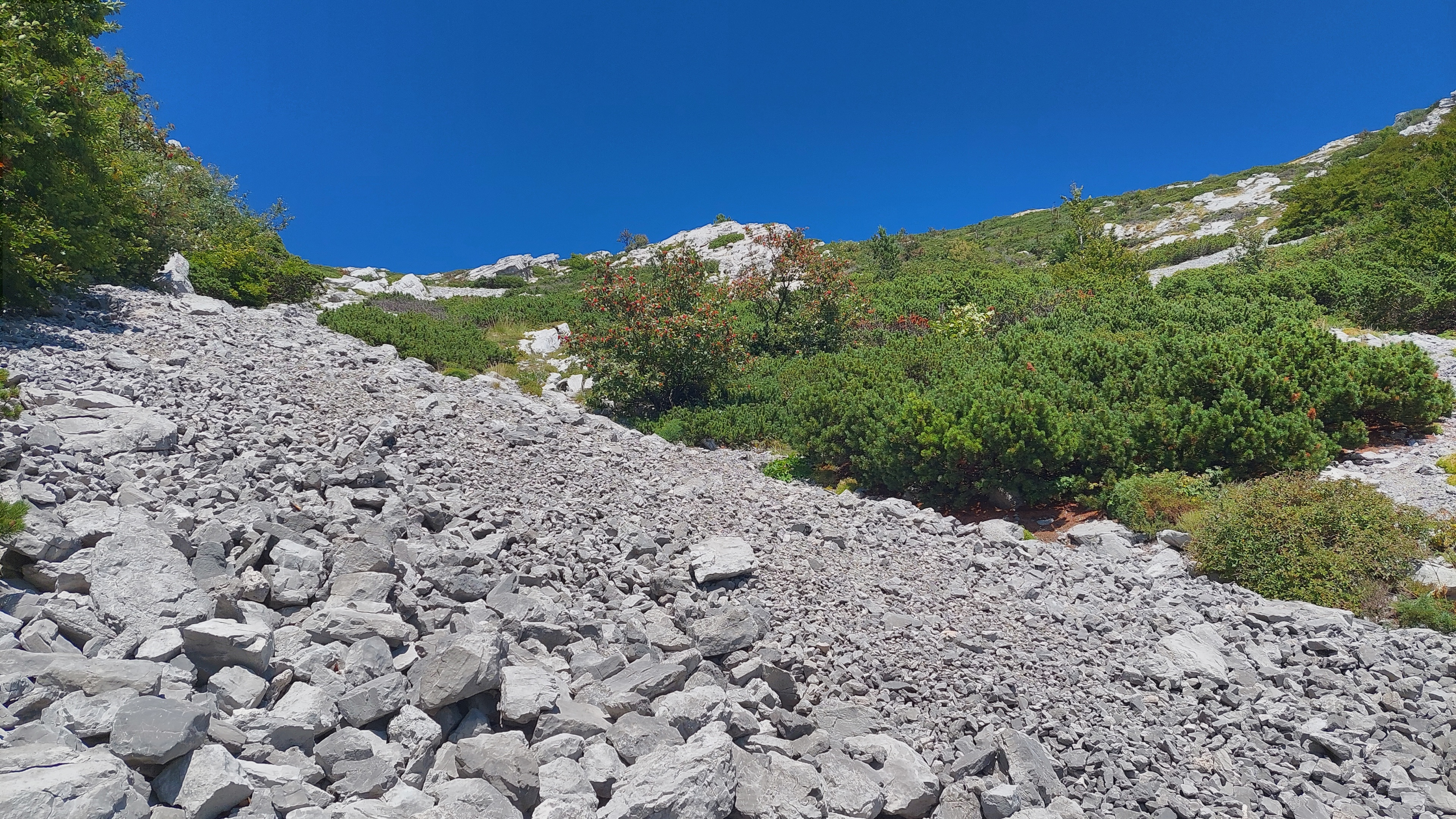
Scree field crossed by mountain trail Lipa staza in longitudinal direction.

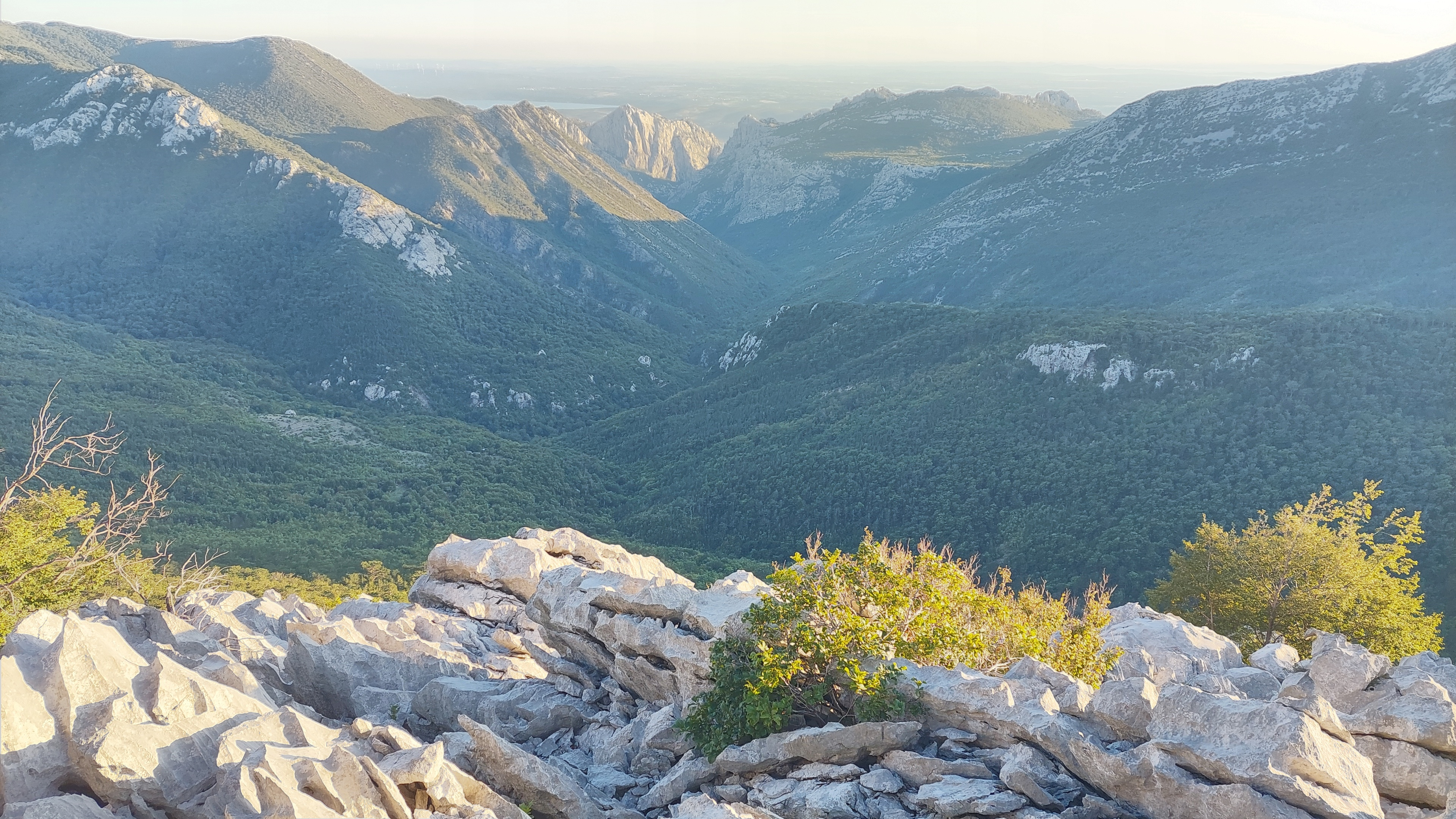
Karst area crossed by mountain trail Bukova staza.
