= Sveti Rok Tunnel =

Road tunnel in Croatia

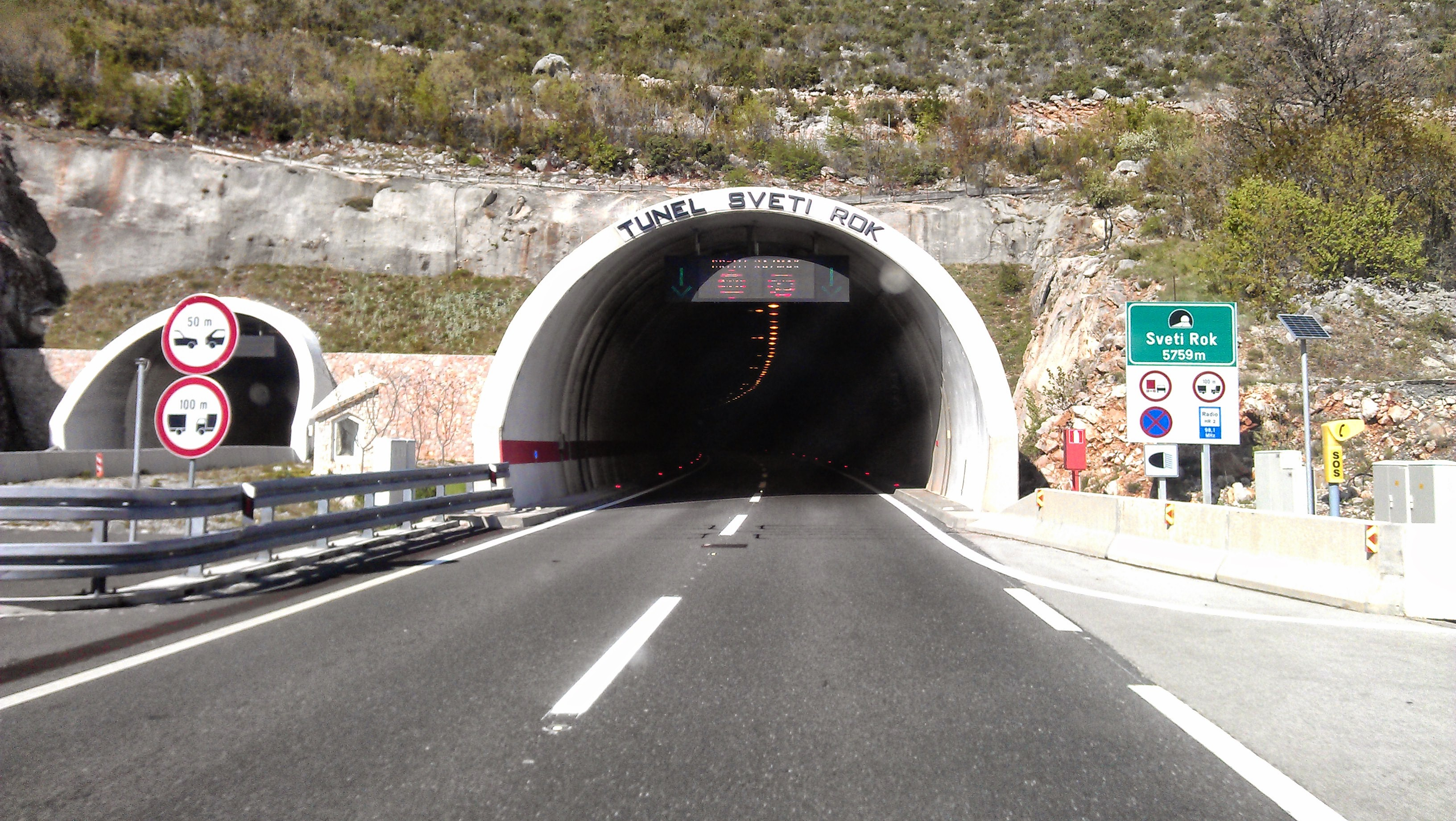

- Location of Sveti Rok Tunnel in Croatia
- Interactive map of Sveti Rok Tunnel

Overview
- Coordinates: 44°18′18″N 15°40′47″E

Technical
- Length: 5.68 kilometres (3.53 mi)

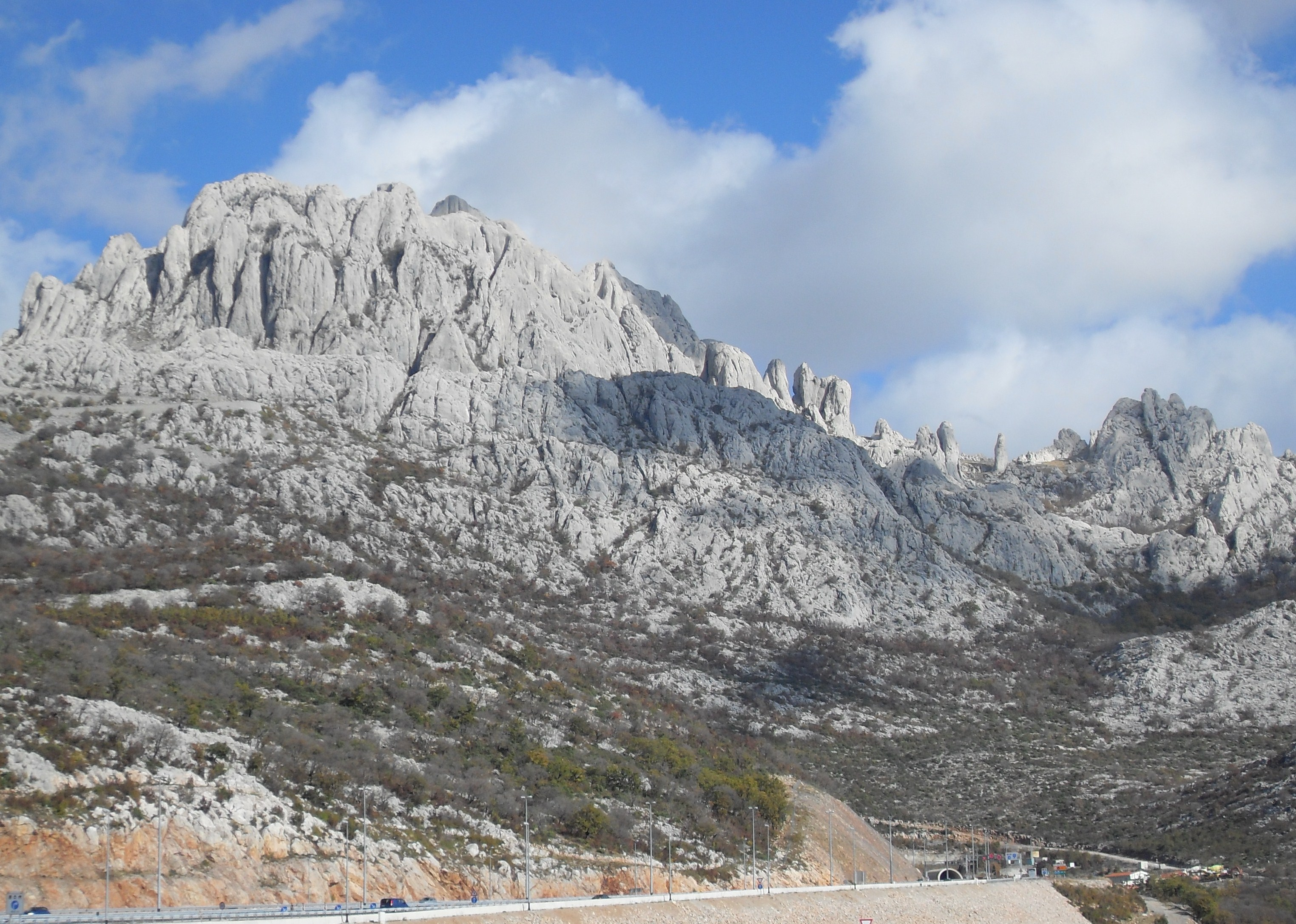
The Sveti Rok Tunnel transverses the Velebit

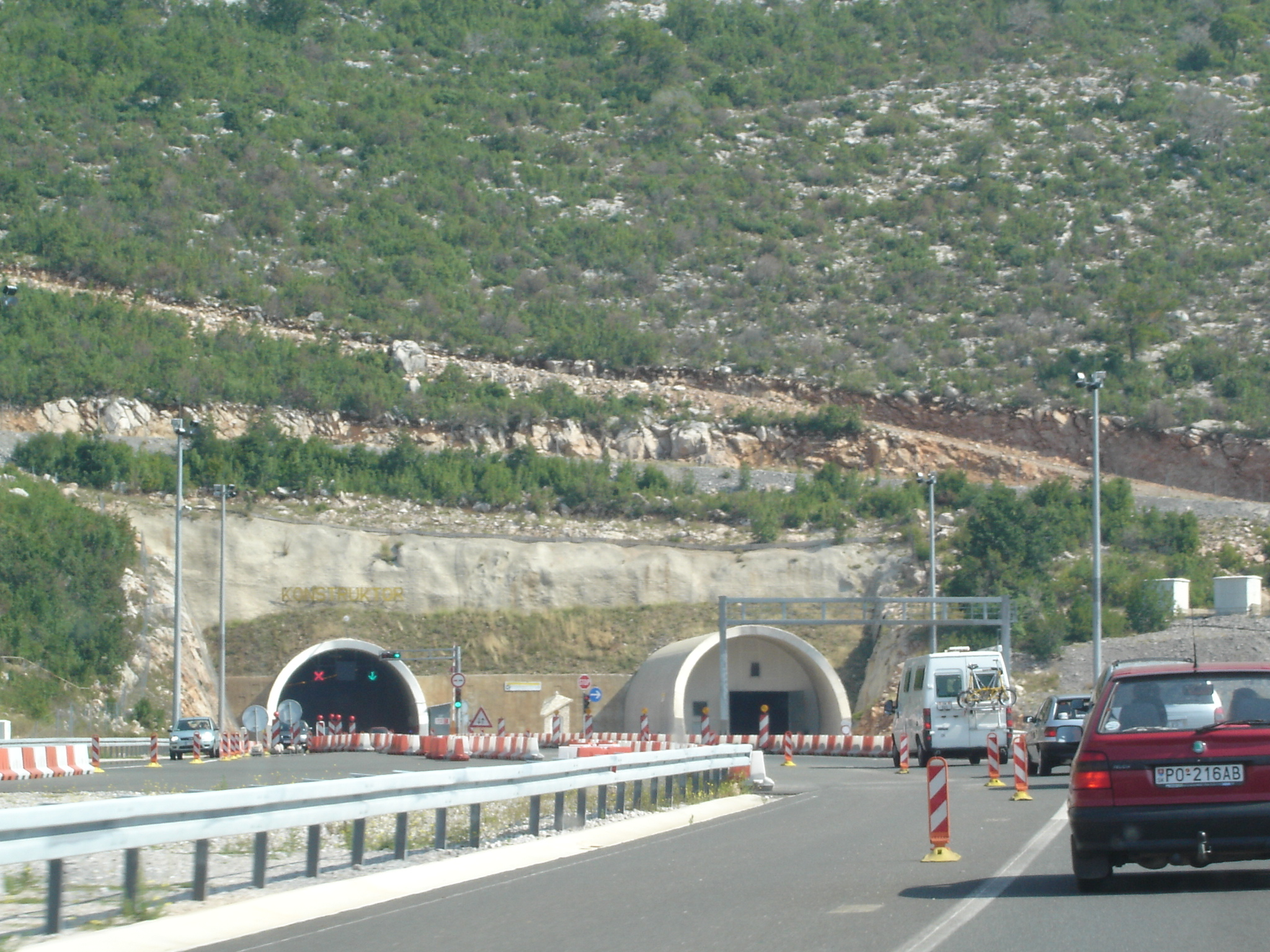
Southern entrance of the tunnel before the second tube was opened

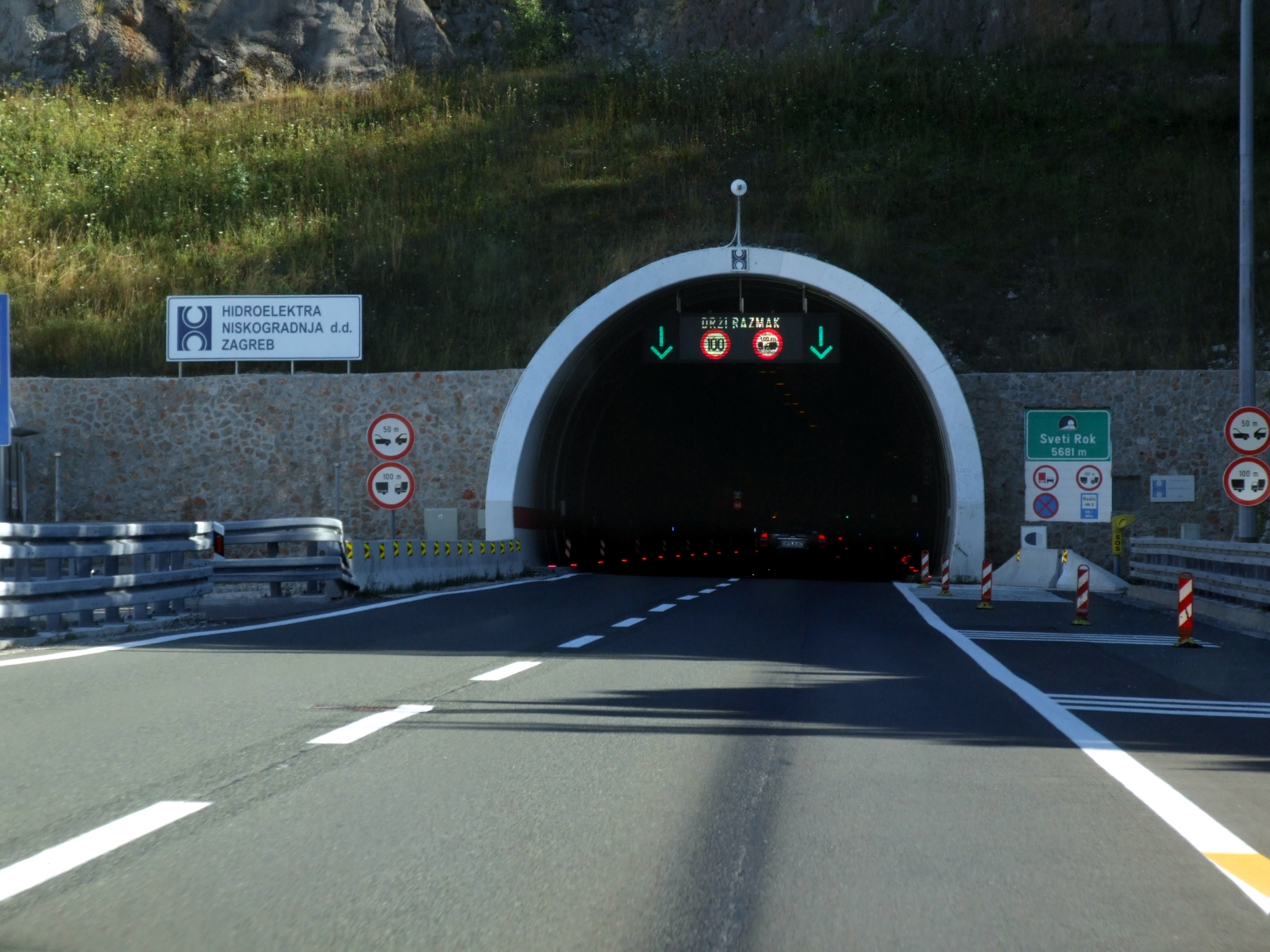
North entrance of the tunnel

The Sveti Rok Tunnel is a road tunnel in Lika, Croatia. It is 5.68 kilometres (3.53 mi) long and passes through the Velebit mountains. The tunnel runs between the Sveti Rok and Rovanjska exits on the A1 highway (Zagreb–Dubrovnik); eponymous villages are located near the tunnel's northbound and southbound entrances respectively.

== Description ==
The northern portal of the tunnel is located at 561 meters above sea level, while the southern portal is located at 510 meters. The eastern tunnel is slightly longer than the western (5,679 metres (18,632 ft) vs 5,670 metres (18,600 ft)). The tunnel tubes are 25 metres (82 ft) apart, and are connected by 4 passages for vehicles and 15 other passages, accessible on foot.

Since the Sveti Rok Tunnel and the Mala Kapela Tunnel are of similar lengths, and their construction was carried out concurrently, they are similar in form and function: the tunnel also has 7.7-metre (25 ft) wide carriageways, permitting driving speeds of up to 100 km/h. The tunnel features an autonomous drainage system channeling water accumulating due to tunnel cleaning, as well as any seeping water, firefighting and accidents. The tunnel is equipped with variable traffic signs in order to ensure enhanced traffic safety of the traffic, regulated from traffic control centres along the A1 motorway. Electronic equipment allows use of two VHF radio frequencies (HR1 at 95.1 MHz and HR2 at 98.1 MHz) as well as cell phones. Electrical power is supplied to the tunnel via one 35 kV switching station at each end of the tunnel and 8 distribution switching stations in the tunnel itself. A backup electrical power supply is also provided to ensure continuous operation of the tunnel.

The tunnel was excavated using the New Austrian Tunnelling method, by means of drilling and explosive blasting. Numerous caves, caverns and other speleological structures were found during constructions, but all of those were addressed successfully. 1,137 metres (3,730 ft) of underground channels were found during construction, including a hall measuring 148 metres (486 ft) by 53 metres (174 ft) by 62 metres (203 ft), found at chainage 200+525. Some of the structures are of considerable length, as they appear to be connected to the surface – as indicated by the presence of bats. The speleological structures encountered during construction presented technical problems, but they have been successfully preserved as natural phenomena.

== Traffic volume ==
Traffic is regularly counted and reported by Hrvatske autoceste, operator of the tunnel and the A1 motorway where the tunnel is located, and published by Hrvatske ceste, the Croatian roads agency. Substantial variations between annual (AADT) and summer (ASDT) traffic volumes are attributed to the fact that the tunnel carries substantial tourist traffic to the Dalmatian Adriatic resorts. The traffic count is performed using analysis of motorway tolls.

Sveti Rok Tunnel traffic volume
Road	Counting site	AADT	ASDT	Notes
A1	4909 Sveti Rok south	12,353	32,125	Between Sveti Rok and Rovanjska interchanges.

== See also ==
- Mala Kapela Tunnel
