= Štirovača =

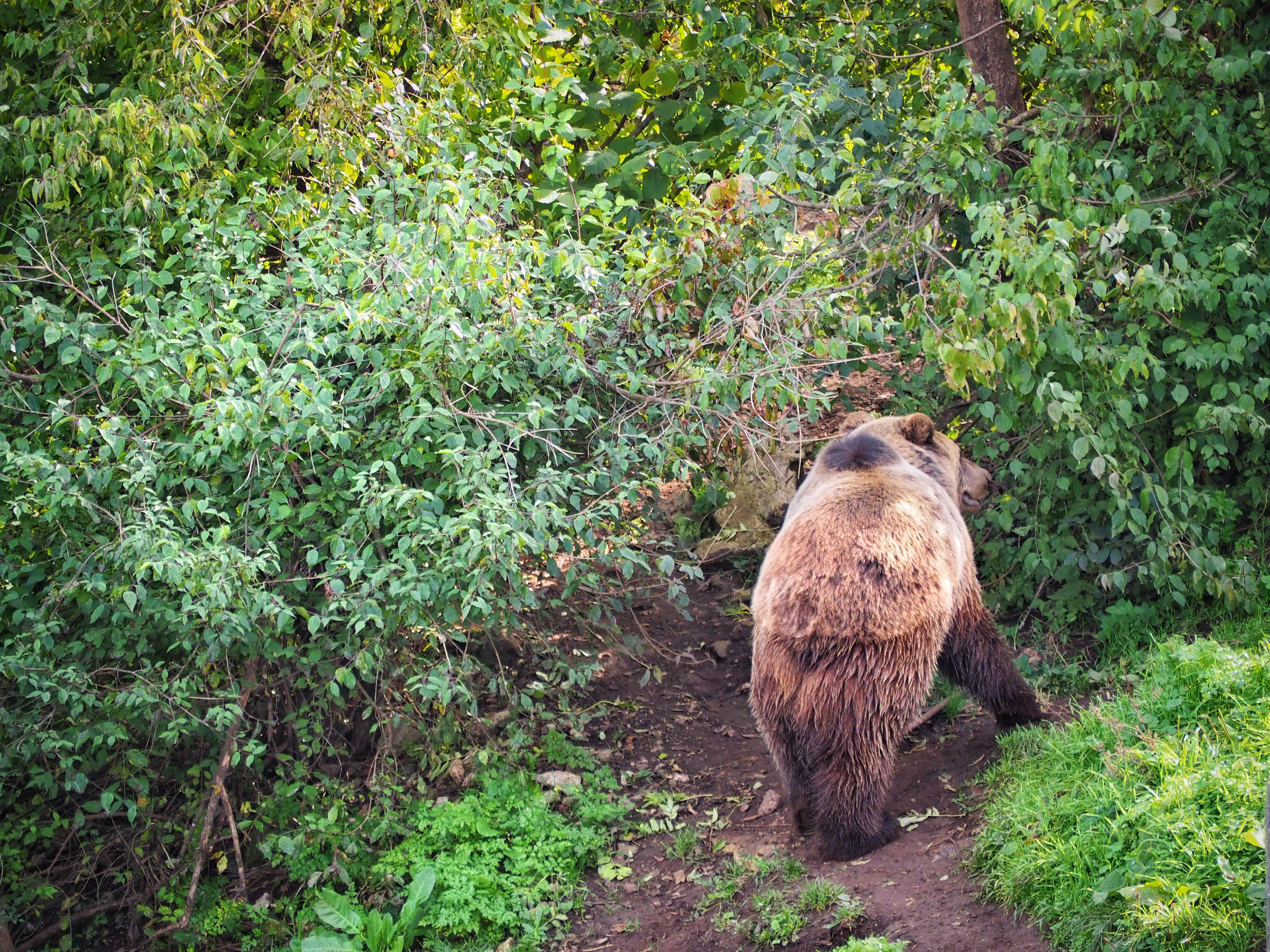
The Bear in the Štirovača.

Štirovača is an Old-growth forest in North Velebit. It is a nature reserve with abundant forest vegetation which covers the area of 118.5 acres. Majority of the forest extends to an altitude above 1100 meters above sea level and is composed mostly of beech, spruce and rowan. The area was once more densely covered with forest, but today a small part of the towering forests remain in Štirovača. This type of the spruce forest (Aremonio-Piceetum) is a relict boreal vegetation that existed in the ice ages, and which stretched far further to south than today's southern border. The land favors podzol soil, high elevation which is required for this type of trees in these latitudes (900 – 1100 m, and Štirovača is at 1100 m) and a relief position, so these forests occur in sinkholes, bays and gorges of Croatian highlands. This is because unique microclimate conditions are present, most notably the cold air is accumulated, and frost areas prevail throughout the year because of the appearance of temperature inversions, and thus the conditions are created for spruce to become more competitive when compared to other tree species.

== History ==
It was the first national park in Croatia. That status was gained in 1928 in Paklenica. Legal protection was mentioned in the financial laws in 1929, when the Plitvice Lakes had also gained the same status. The current status was acquired on April 26, 1965.

== Sources ==
- http://www.sumari.hr/sumlist/gootxt.asp?id=200313&s=107 Forest list
- http://www.velebit.hr/lokacije.php
- http://www.avia.croadria.com/nov/velebit.htm
- https://www.np-sjeverni-velebit.hr
