= Mala Kapela Tunnel =

Longest tunnel in Croatia

- Location of Mala Kapela Tunnel in Croatia
- Interactive map of Mala Kapela Tunnel

Overview
- Coordinates: 45°4′2″N 15°12′37″E

Mala Kapela Tunnel (Croatian: Tunel Mala Kapela) is the most significant structure on the Croatian A1 motorway route. As it is 5,821 metres (19,098 ft) long (northbound tube), Mala Kapela Tunnel is the longest tunnel in Croatia. The tunnel is geographically located between the villages of Jezerane and Modruš (although it cannot be accessed from the villages directly), and between Ogulin and Brinje motorway interchanges. The tunnel passes through the Mala Kapela mountain in the northeast-southwest direction. The first tunnel tube through the Mala Kapela mountain was completed in 2005, and was used for both directions of traffic until the second tube was completed in 2009.

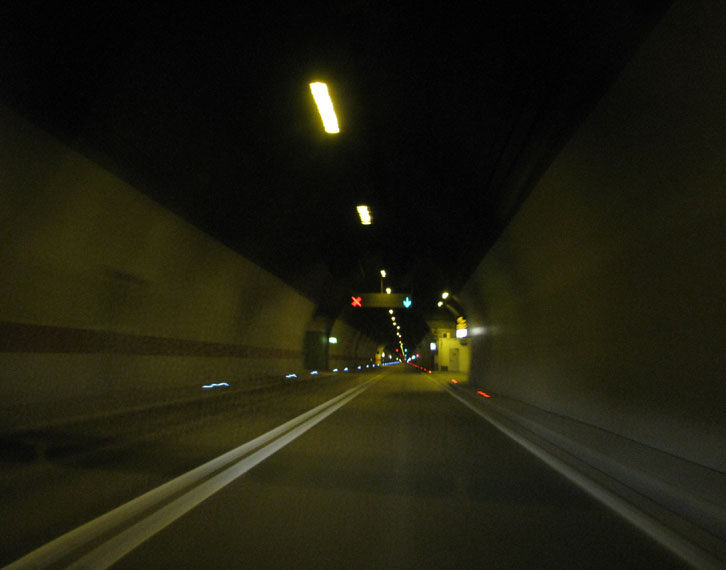
Mala Kapela Tunnel, prior to opening of the second tunnel tube.

The tunnel is tolled within the A1 motorway closed toll collection system. There are no other toll plazas related to use of the tunnel.

== Characteristics ==
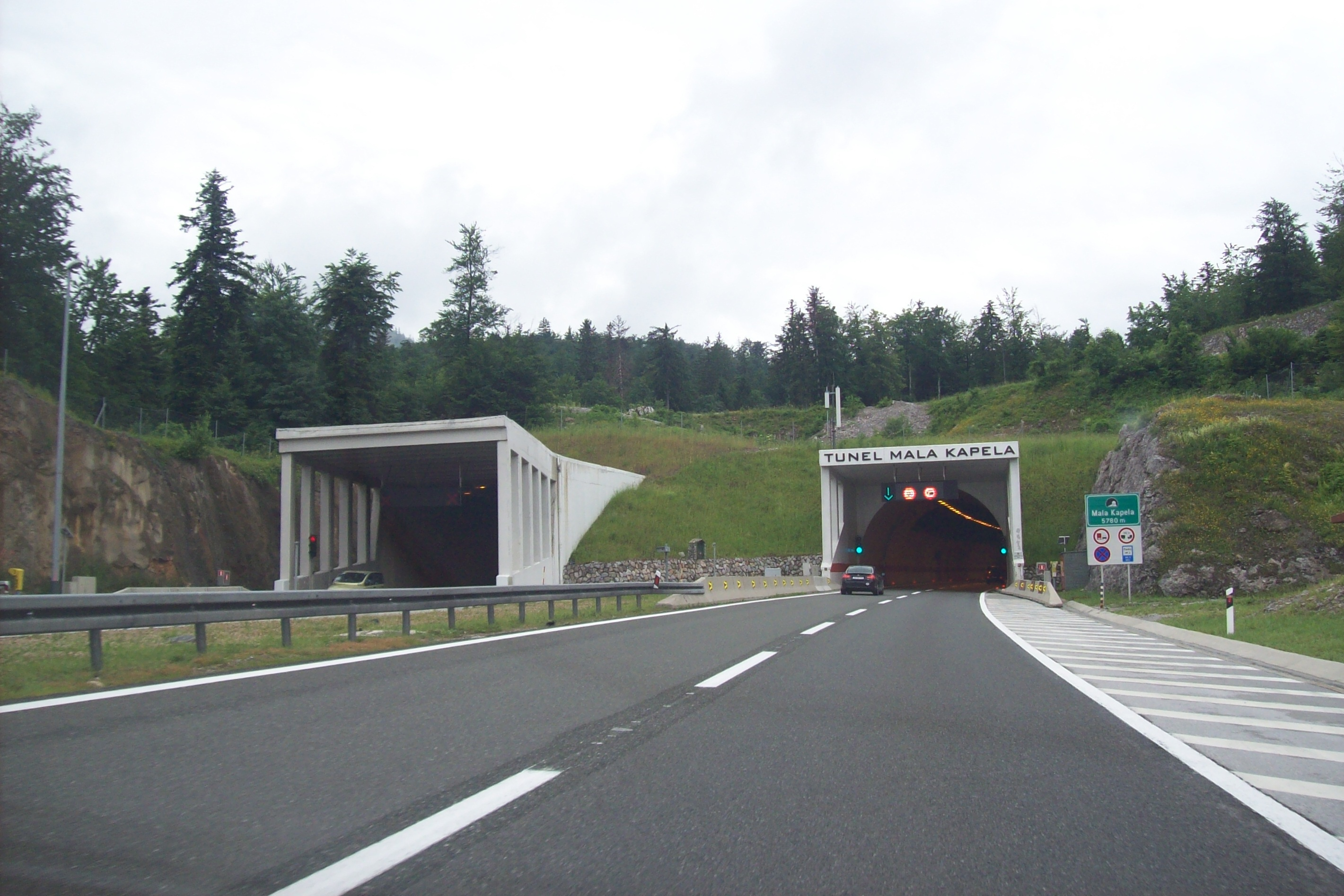
Mala Kapela Tunnel – northern portal.

The northern portal of the tunnel is located at elevation of 562 m.a.s.l., while the southern one is found at 575 m.a.s.l. The tunnel tubes are not equally long - the northbound tube is 5,821 metres (19,098 ft) long, while the southbound one is somewhat shorter, as it is 5,780 metres (18,960 ft) long. The tunnel tubes are excavated 25 metres (82 ft) m apart, and are linked by 6 vehicle passages and 14 pedestrian passages.

The tunnel comprises 7.7 metres (25 ft) wide carriageways, permitting driving speeds of up to 100 km/h. The tunnel features an autonomous drainage system channeling water accumulating during cleaning of the tunnel, as well as seeping water and liquids spilled in accidents or used for firefighting.

The tunnel was executed using New Austrian Tunnelling method, by means of drilling and explosive blasting. Numerous caves, caverns and other speleological structures were found during the construction, but all of those were addressed successfully.

The tunnel is equipped with variable traffic signs in order to ensure enhanced safety of the traffic, regulated from traffic control centres along the A1 motorway. Electronic equipment of the tunnel allows radio reception of two UHF radio frequencies (HR1 at 92.1 MHz and HR2 at 98.5 MHz) as well as use of cell phones. Electrical power is supplied to the tunnel through one 35 kV switching station at each end of the tunnel and 8 distribution switching stations in the tunnel itself. A backup electrical power supply is also provided to ensure continuous operation of the tunnel.

== Traffic volume ==
Traffic is regularly counted and reported by Croatian Motorways Ltd, operator of the A1 motorway and the tunnel, and published by Hrvatske Ceste. Substantial variations between annual (AADT) and summer (ASDT) traffic volumes are attributed to the fact that the motorway carries substantial tourist traffic to the Dalmatian Adriatic resorts. The traffic count is performed using analysis of toll ticket sales.

Mala Kapela Tunnel traffic volume
Road	Counting site	AADT	ASDT	Notes
A1	3025 Ogulin south	12,640	31,166	Between Ogulin and Brinje interchanges.

== See also ==
- A1 motorway
- Sveti Rok Tunnel
- List of longest tunnels
