= Velebit =

Mountain range in Croatia

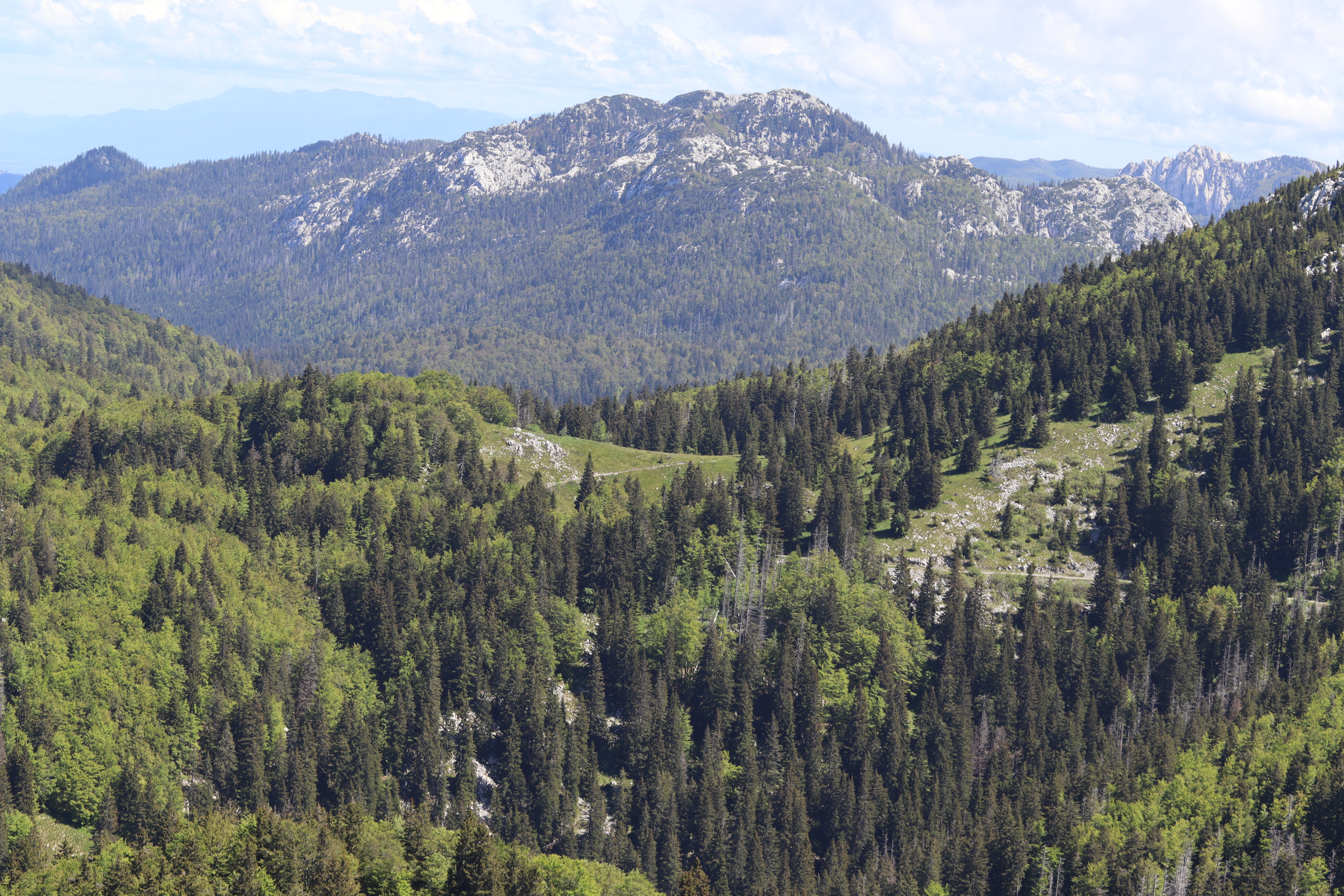
- Northern Velebit National Park

Highest point
- Elevation: 1,758 m (5,768 ft)
- Prominence: 1,060 m (3,480 ft)
- Listing: Ribu
- Coordinates: 44°32′N 15°14′E

Geography
- Location within Croatia
- Location: Croatia
- Parent range: Dinaric Alps

Velebit (pronounced [ʋe̞le̞bit]) is the largest, though not the highest, mountain range in Croatia. The range forms a part of the Dinaric Alps and is located along the Adriatic coast, separating it from Lika in the interior. Velebit begins in the northwest near Senj with the Vratnik mountain pass and ends 145 km to the southeast near the source of the Zrmanja river northwest of Knin.

Its highest peak is the Vaganski vrh at 1,758 m (5,768 ft). Major mountain passes on Velebit include the aforementioned Vratnik or Senjsko bilo at 694 m.a.s.l., where the Josephina connects Senj with Josipdol; Oštarijska vrata at 928 m.a.s.l. that connects Karlobag and Gospić; and Prezid at 766 m.a.s.l. that connects Obrovac and Gračac.

Velebit is characterized by its simple, solid form, stiff cliffs, the lack of vegetation on the seaward side (towards the Velebit Channel), and the wood-covered slopes of the Lika side. The basic geological characteristic of the mountains is karst; flora and fauna are abundant. The whole mountain range is protected as a nature park. The most popular spots on Velebit are: the peak of Vučjak (1,644 m) above Zavižan, the botanical gardens and caves, Hajdučki and Rožanski kukovi, Štirovača, the Northern Velebit National Park and the Paklenica National Park. The Croatian Meteorological and Hydrological Service has a permanent measurement station at Zavižan.

== Regions ==
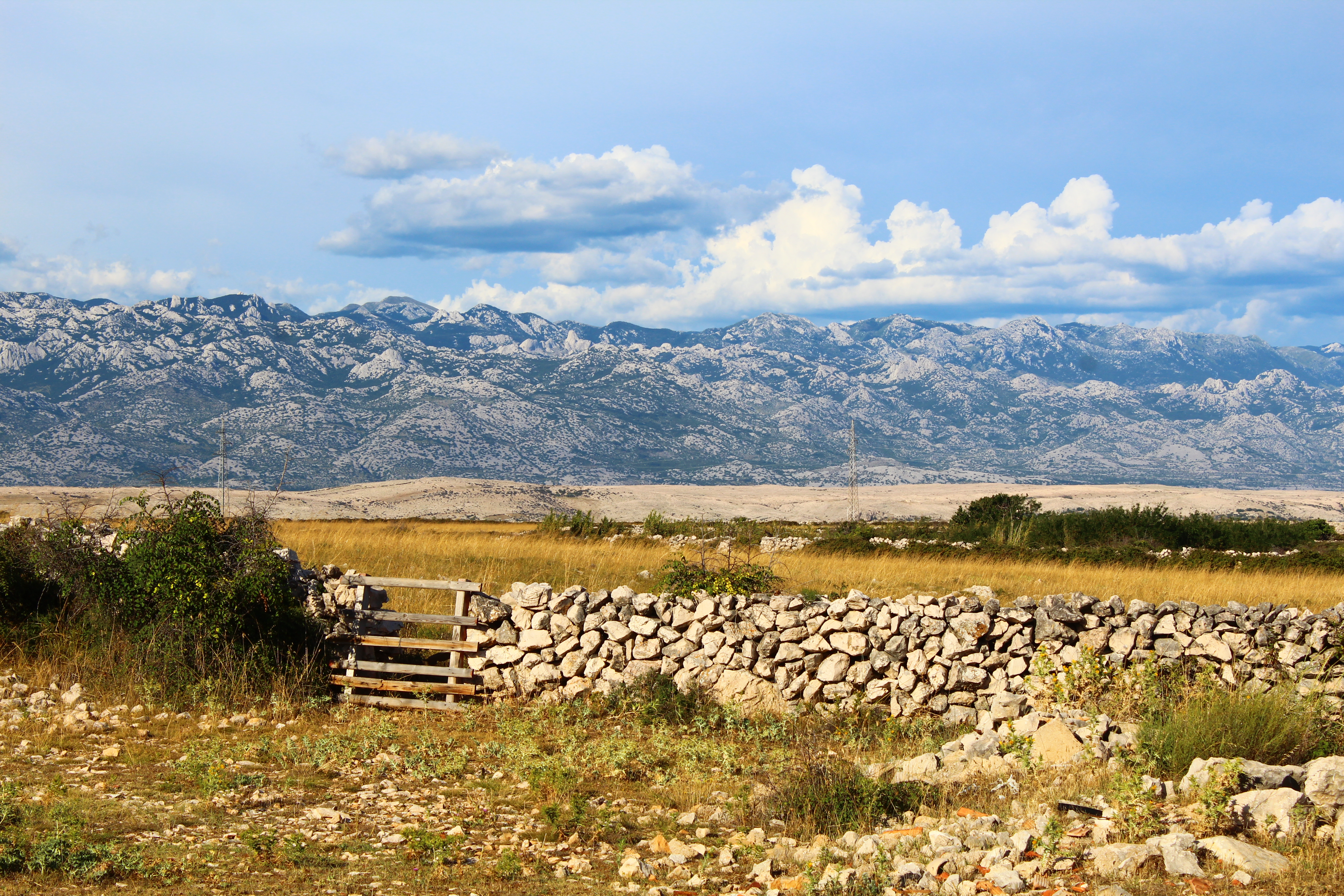
The Velebit range as seen from the island of Pag

Velebit is usually divided into three regions:

- the northern part between the mountain passes Vratnik and Veliki Alan, with the highest peaks including:
  - Mali Rajinac (1699 m)
  - Veliki Zavižan (1676 m)
  - Veliki (Zavižanski) Pivčevac (1676 m)
  - Gromovača (1676 m)
- the middle part between Veliki Alan and Baške Oštarije with the highest peaks including:
  - Šatorina (1622 m)
  - Zečjak (1622 m)
  - Laktin vrh (1504 m)
- the southern part between Oštarije and Mali Alan, with the highest peaks including:
  - Vaganski vrh (1758 m)
  - Sveto brdo (1751 m)
  - Visočica (1615 m)
  - Crnopac (1402 m) in the far southeastern part

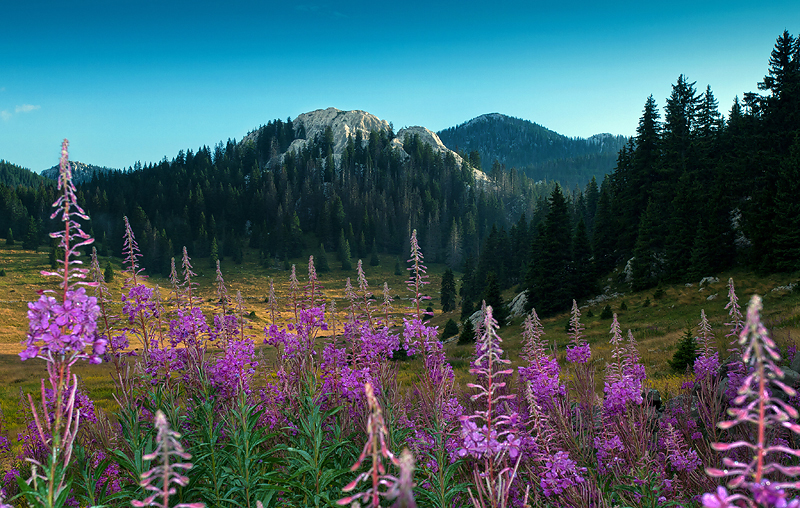
The back side of the Velebit mountain

Velebit as a whole is a nature park, from which two national parks have been carved out: Paklenica and Sjeverni Velebit (Northern Velebit)

A further category of nature preservation exists within Sjeverni Velebit, the special reservation Hajdučki i Rožanski Kukovi, under the highest nature protection available in Croatia. Officially no human activity is allowed there (except research). These are the mostly still unexplored and wild places and probably will stay that way in the future.

A pathway called Premužićeva staza (Premužić's pathway) leads through the northern and middle parts of Velebit. This pathway was built between 1930 and 1933 and it connects northern and southern Velebit. Its length is 57 kilometres (35 mi). Many parts of Velebit would not be reachable without it. The Velebit mountains are transversed by the A1 through the Sveti Rok Tunnel.

=== Peaks and areas of Velebit ===
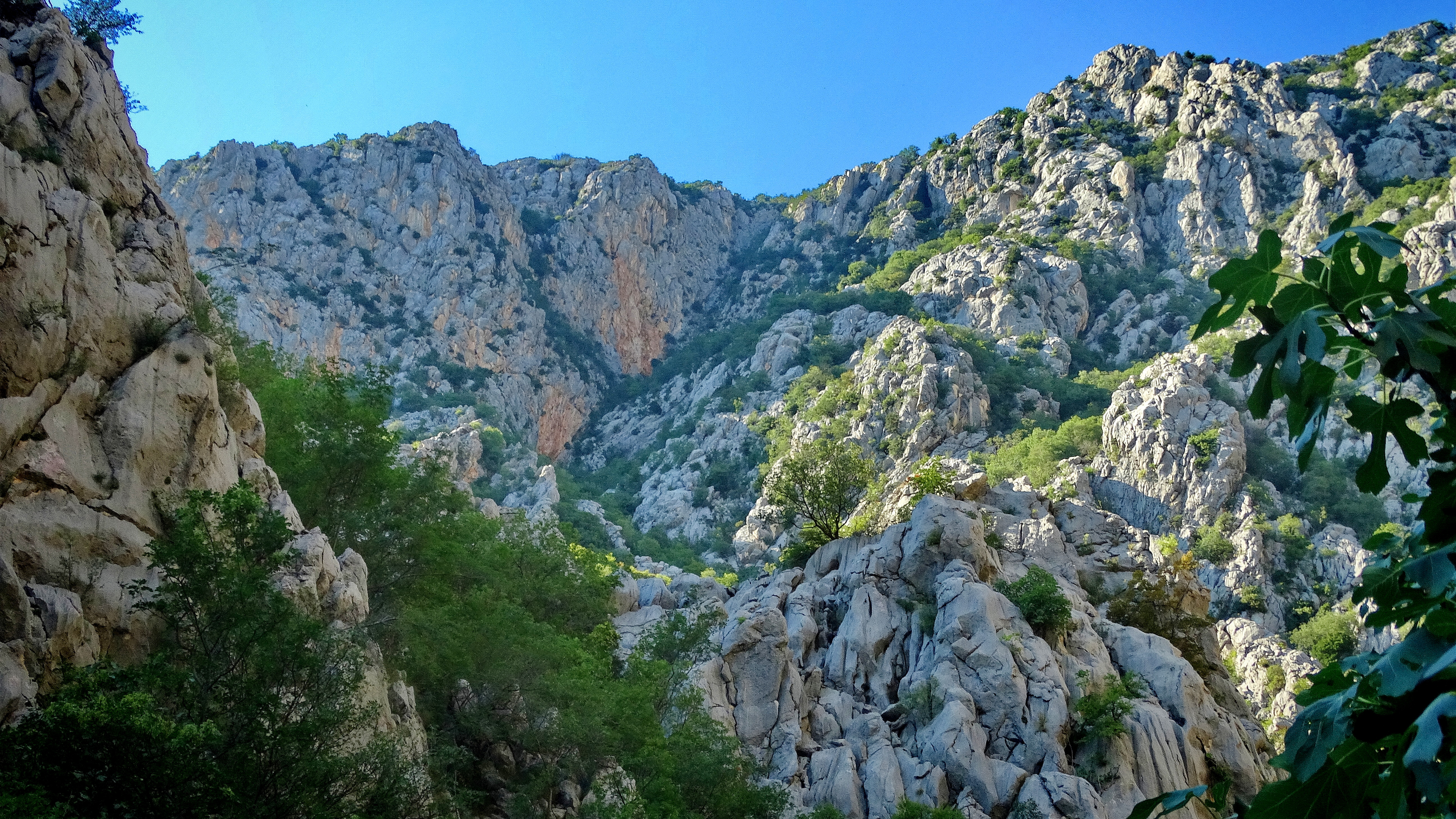
Paklenica National Park

- Zavižan area – North Velebit (Mali Rajinac) (1699 m)
- Rožanski Kukovi group – North Velebit (Gromovaca (1676 m) and Vratarski Kuk (1676 m)
- Alančić, Rožanski Vrh, Seravski Vrh, North Velebit (Goli Vrh (1670 m)
- Veliki Kozjak (1629 m), North Velebit
- Šatorina (1624 m) – Mid Velebit
- Stap area – South Velebit, (Debeli Kuk) (1269 m)
- Visočica (1619 m) – South Velebit
- Bojin Kuk (1110 m) – South Velebit
- Viserujna (1632 m) and Rujno – South Velebit
- Paklenica area – South Velebit
- Vaganski vrh (1758 m) – South Velebit (highest peak of Velebit)
- Liburnija (1710 m) – South Velebit
- Sveto Brdo (1751 m) – South Velebit
- Tulove Grede (1120 m) – Southeast Velebit
- Crnopac (1404 m) – Southeast Velebit

Some 45 peaks exceed 1600 m.

Plješivica or Velebitska Plješivica is a peak in the north of Velebit (1654 m) that hosts a communications tower and a former military facility. There is also a smaller peak of Pljišivica in the north of Velebit (1560 m).

In the categorization of 113 of the highest points of Croatia by professor Vladimir Volenec, first published in 1990 and revised in 2015, there are 76 peaks from the Velebit.

== The caves ==
There are hundreds of "holes" on Velebit. It has the largest and deepest caves in Croatia. The three-part "Lukina jama" cave is 1392 m deep, making it one of the deepest caves in the world, and the deepest in southeast Europe, while the "Slovačka jama" is 1320 m. What makes it unique is that it is completely vertical, steepest in the world. At the bottom of the pothole is a water course or siphon with branches that are still unexplored. A kind of leech was discovered in the pothole, which has been ascertained to represent a new species, genus and family; it has been named Erpobdella mestrovi.

List of sinkholes on Velebit deeper than 500 m:

1. Lukina Jama, 1431 m, Hajdučki Kukovi – North Velebit
2. Jama Nedam, 1335 m, Hajdučki Kukovi – North Velebit
3. Slovačka Jama, 1324 m, Rožanski Kukovi – North Velebit
4. Velebita, 1026 m, Rožanski Kukovi – North Velebit
5. sustav Crnopac, 842 m, Crnopac – North Velebit
6. Meduza, 706 m, Rožanski Kukovi – North Velebit
7. Munižaba, 652 m, Crnopac – North Velebit
8. Patkov Gušt, 553 m, Hajdučki Kukovi – North Velebit
9. Ledena Jama, 536 m, Lomska Duliba – North Velebit
10. Ponor na Bunovcu, 534 m, Bunovac – South Velebit
11. Jama Olimp, 531 m, Hajdučki Kukovi – North Velebit
12. Lubuška Jama, 521 m, Hajdučki Kukovi – North Velebit

== Ecology ==
Velebit is a biodiverse region of Croatia and home to several endemic species of plants, including Degenia velebitica, a protected species of plant in the mustard family which grows on scree slopes. It was discovered in 1907 by the Hungarian botanist Árpád von Degen. Other endemic plant species include Arenaria orbicularis, Crocus malyi, Euphorbia triflora, Hieracium velebiticum, Hieracium obrovacense, Knautia pectinata, and Knautia velebitica.

Typical Velebit landscape

== Climate ==
Between 1962 and 2010, the highest temperature recorded at the Baške Oštarije weather station was 33.0 °C (91.4 °F), on 22 August 2000. The lowest temperature was −23.0 °C (−9.4 °F), on 3 March 2005.

Since records began in 1954, the highest temperature recorded at the Zavižan weather station at an elevation of 1,594 metres (5,230 ft) was 28.3 °C (82.9 °F), on 22 July 2015. The coldest temperature was −28.6 °C (−19.5 °F), on 10 February 1956.

Climate data for Zavižan (1971-2000 normals, extremes 1951-2021)
Month	Jan	Feb	Mar	Apr	May	Jun	Jul	Aug	Sep	Oct	Nov	Dec	Year
Record high °C (°F)	12.5 (54.5)	13.8 (56.8)	16.5 (61.7)	19.4 (66.9)	23.1 (73.6)	26.4 (79.5)	28.3 (82.9)	28.2 (82.8)	27.2 (81.0)	20.6 (69.1)	19.2 (66.6)	14.6 (58.3)	28.2 (82.8)
Mean daily maximum °C (°F)	−0.7 (30.7)	−0.9 (30.4)	1.4 (34.5)	4.4 (39.9)	10.1 (50.2)	13.6 (56.5)	16.6 (61.9)	16.9 (62.4)	12.6 (54.7)	8.4 (47.1)	3.2 (37.8)	0.5 (32.9)	7.2 (45.0)
Daily mean °C (°F)	−3.5 (25.7)	−4.0 (24.8)	−1.7 (28.9)	1.2 (34.2)	6.5 (43.7)	9.9 (49.8)	12.5 (54.5)	12.4 (54.3)	8.9 (48.0)	5.0 (41.0)	0.2 (32.4)	−2.4 (27.7)	3.8 (38.8)
Mean daily minimum °C (°F)	−6.1 (21.0)	−6.5 (20.3)	−4.3 (24.3)	−1.2 (29.8)	3.8 (38.8)	7.0 (44.6)	9.4 (48.9)	9.5 (49.1)	6.2 (43.2)	2.4 (36.3)	−2.3 (27.9)	−5.0 (23.0)	1.1 (34.0)
Record low °C (°F)	−24.5 (−12.1)	−28.6 (−19.5)	−22.6 (−8.7)	−14.5 (5.9)	−9.8 (14.4)	−3.1 (26.4)	0.2 (32.4)	−2.0 (28.4)	−4.0 (24.8)	−11.5 (11.3)	−16.8 (1.8)	−24.2 (−11.6)	−28.6 (−19.5)
Average precipitation mm (inches)	144.7 (5.70)	147.2 (5.80)	147.0 (5.79)	179.3 (7.06)	154.7 (6.09)	156.4 (6.16)	86.5 (3.41)	121.8 (4.80)	180.4 (7.10)	215.9 (8.50)	245.6 (9.67)	204.0 (8.03)	1,983.4 (78.09)
Average precipitation days (≥ 0.1 mm)	14.7	14.1	14.4	16.1	13.6	13.6	9.6	9.4	11.7	13.7	15.0	15.4	161.3
Average relative humidity (%)	80.6	79.8	80.4	81.1	78.6	77.1	72.6	73.5	77.9	80.8	82.6	81.4	78.9
Mean monthly sunshine hours	99.2	115.8	145.7	156.0	217.0	237.0	297.6	282.1	204.0	142.6	96.0	89.9	2,082.9
Percentage possible sunshine	35	40	40	41	51	55	67	68	55	42	34	34	49
Source: Croatian Meteorological and Hydrological Service

== Mountain huts ==
In the 1935–1936 season, the Gojtanov dom mountain hut (open 1 May through 31 October), at 1,460 metres (4,790 ft) in elevation on Visočica, saw 232 visitors, including 3 Russian citizens. The mountain hut on Crnopac, at 750 metres (2,460 ft), normally open from 1 May to 31 October was closed at the time, but open year-round the next season. In the 1936–1937 season, it saw 149 visitors. In the 1937–1938 season, Gojtanov dom saw no visitors; the hut on Crnopac and the new mountain shelter on Bunovac were open.

== Velebit in literature ==
The imposing nature of the Velebit mountain has made it something of a national symbol in Croatian folklore. There is a patriotic folk song "Vila Velebita" that personifies a fairy in Velebit.

In the Republic of Venice, Velebit was known as Montagna della Morlacca ("Mountain of the Morlach"), named after the Morlachs, an originally Romance ethnic group that eventually got assimilated into the local Croatian population, a generally socio-cultural and professional segment of the Slavic-speaking population rather than a Romance-speaking ethnicity.

Planine, the first Croatian novel by Petar Zoranić, was inspired by the Velebit mountain.

== Gallery ==
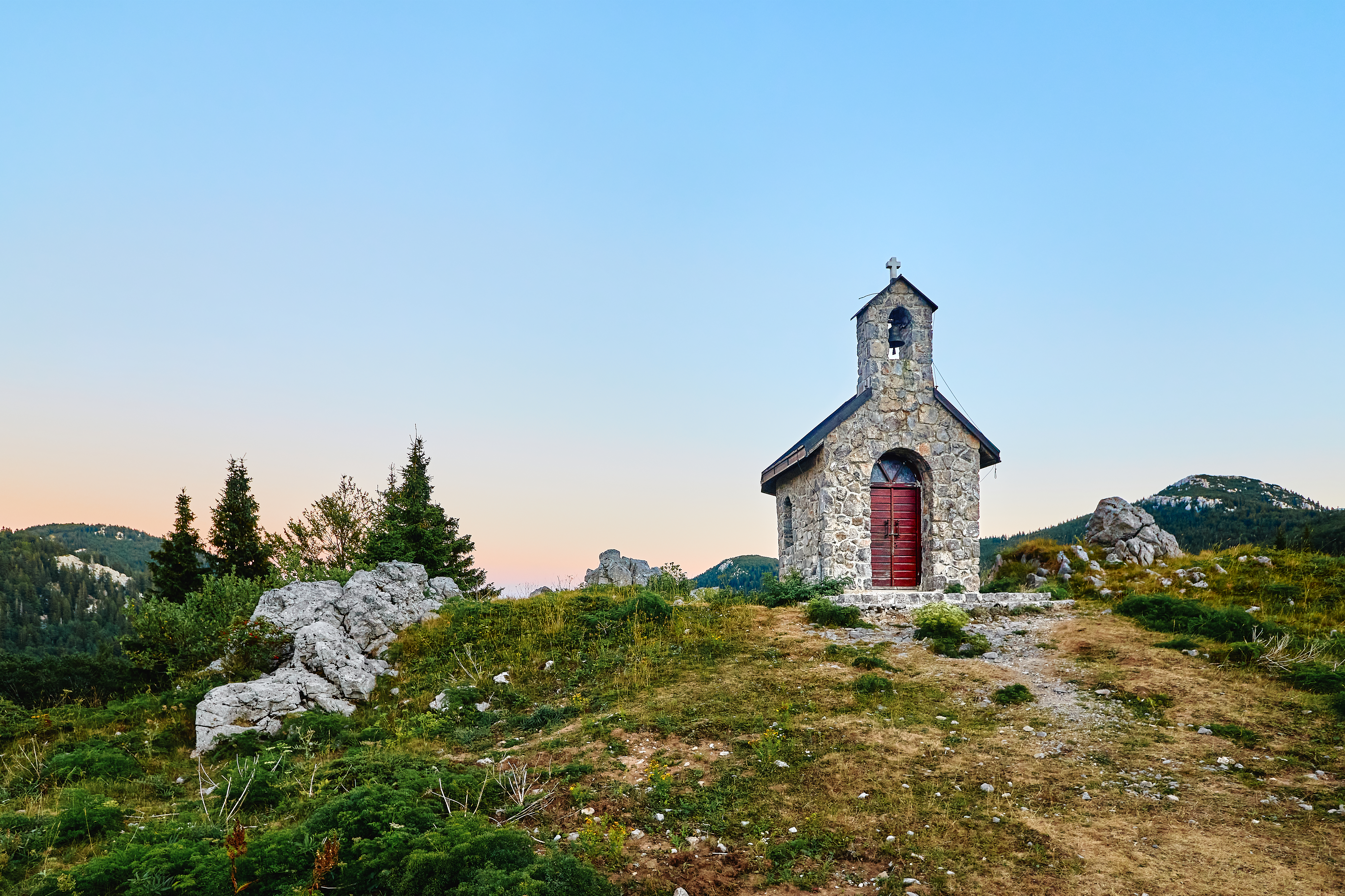
Saint Anthony's Chapel

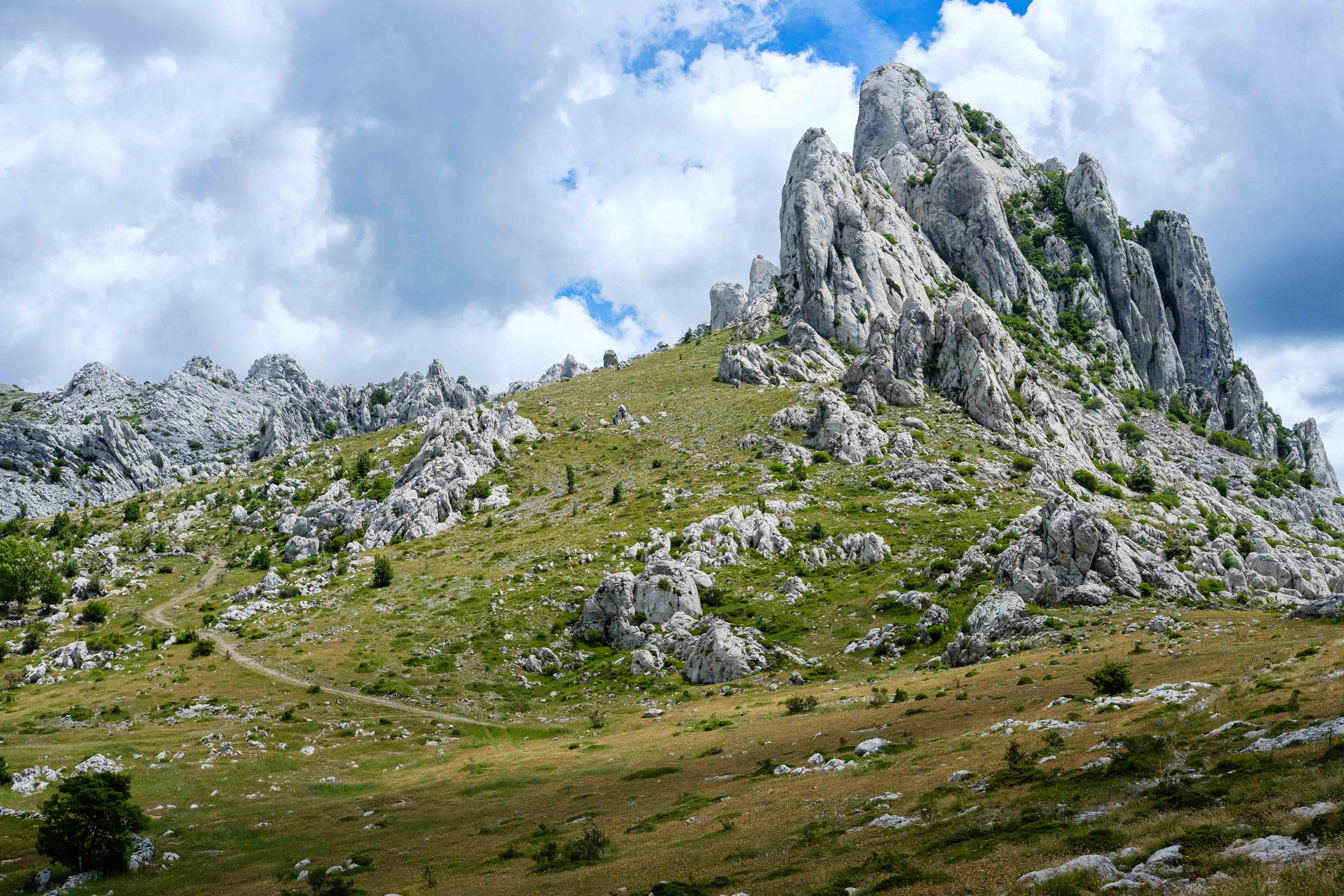
Tutlove grede

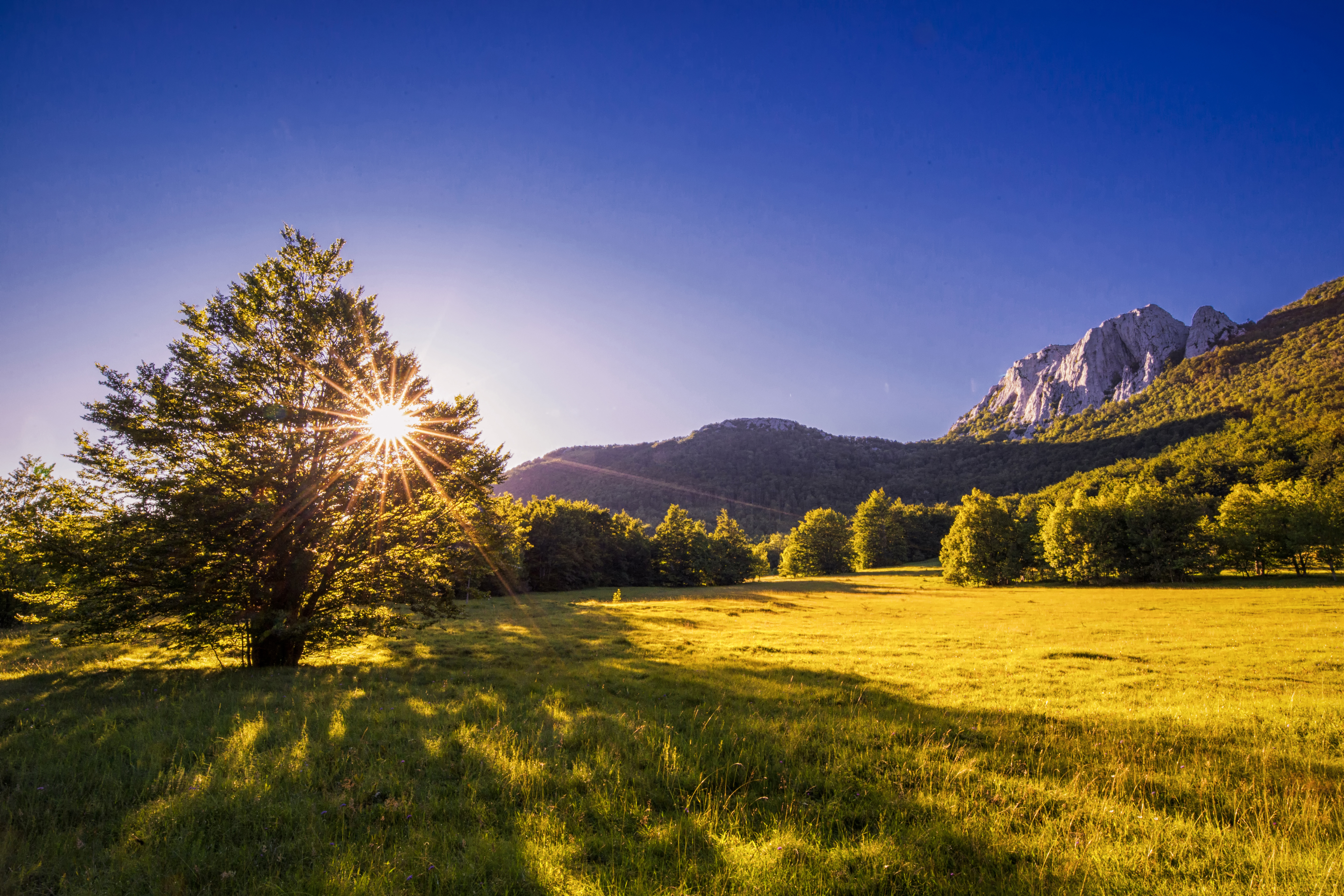
Velebit field

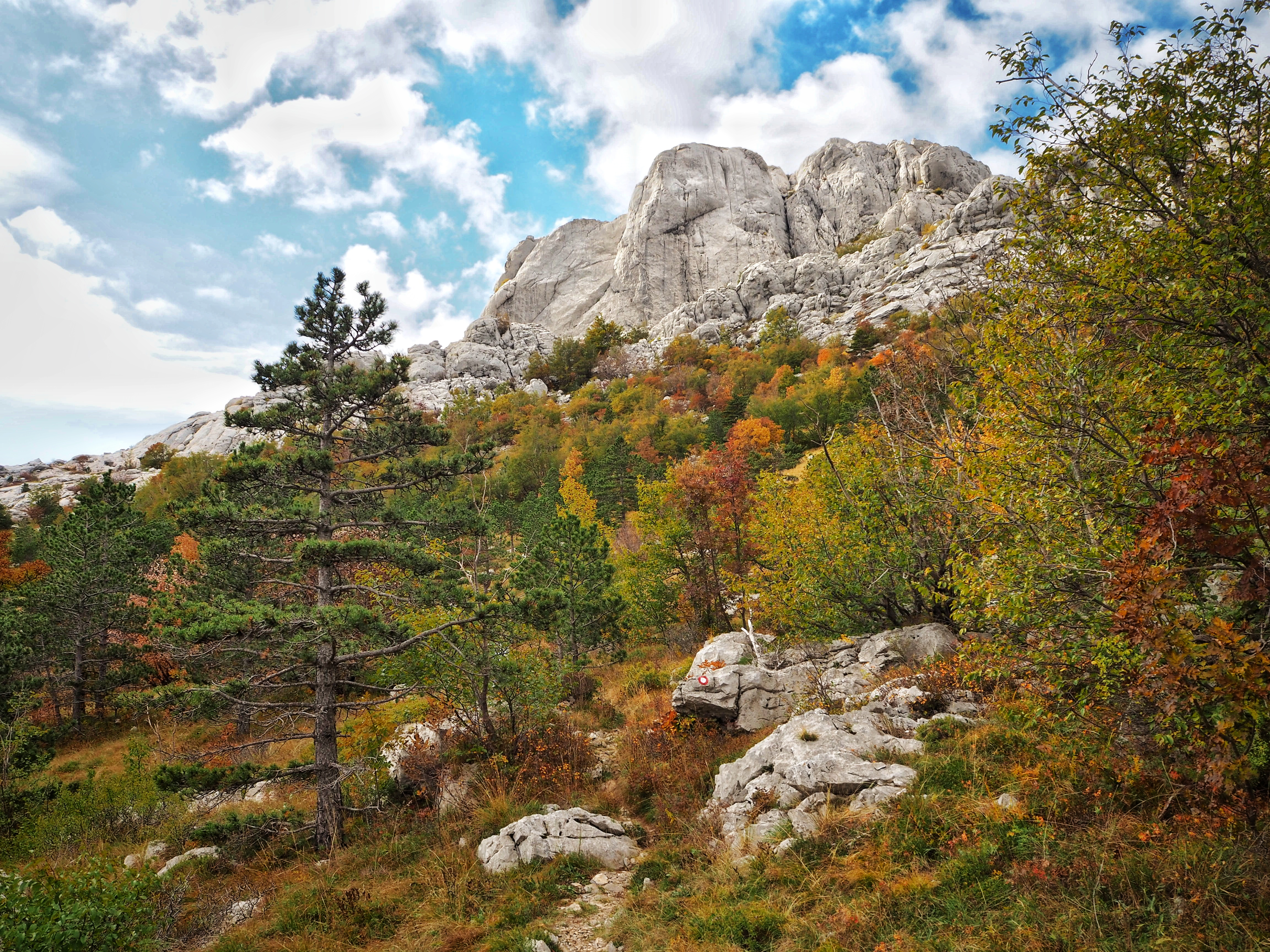
Veliko Rujno

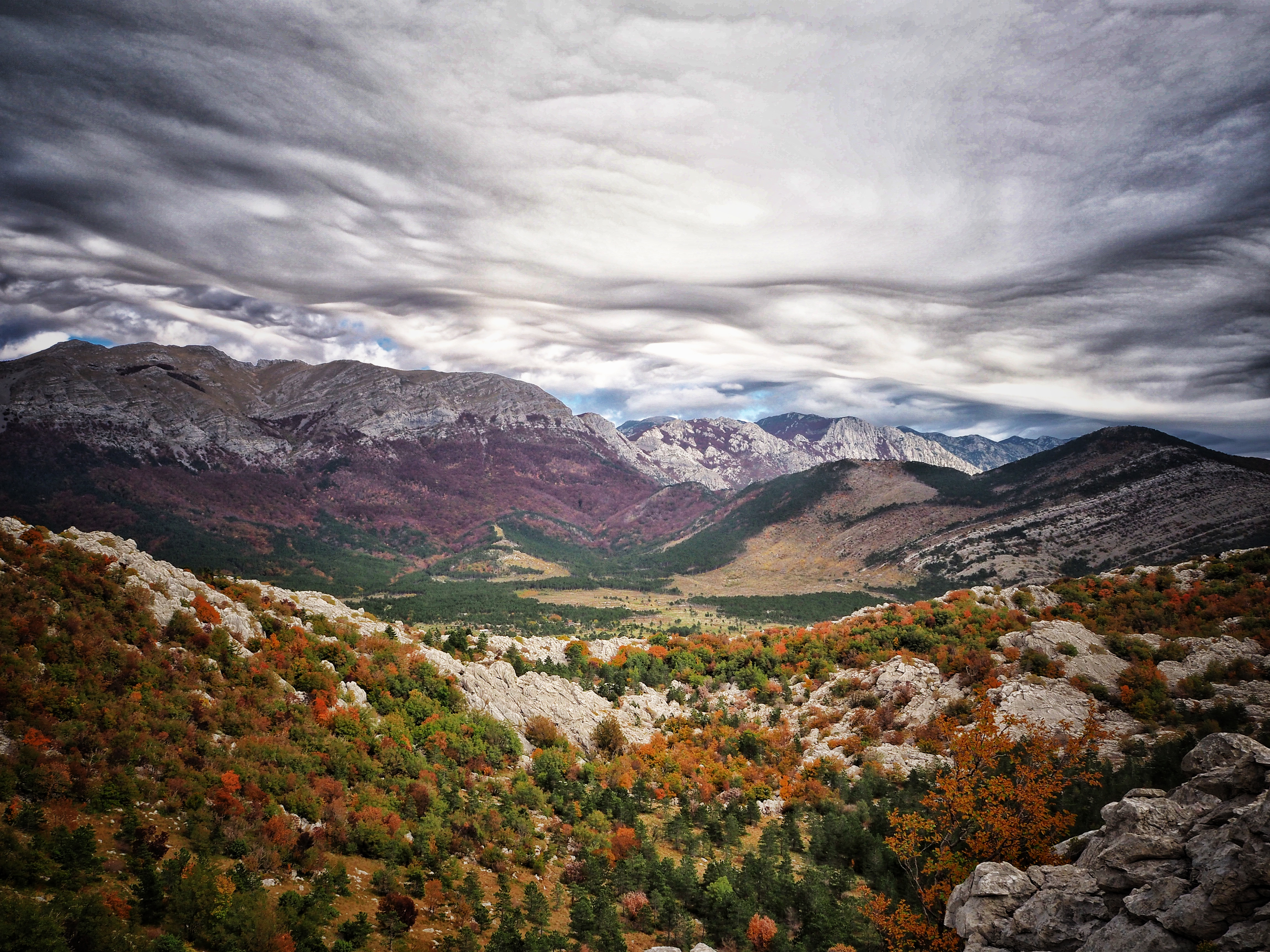
Bojinac

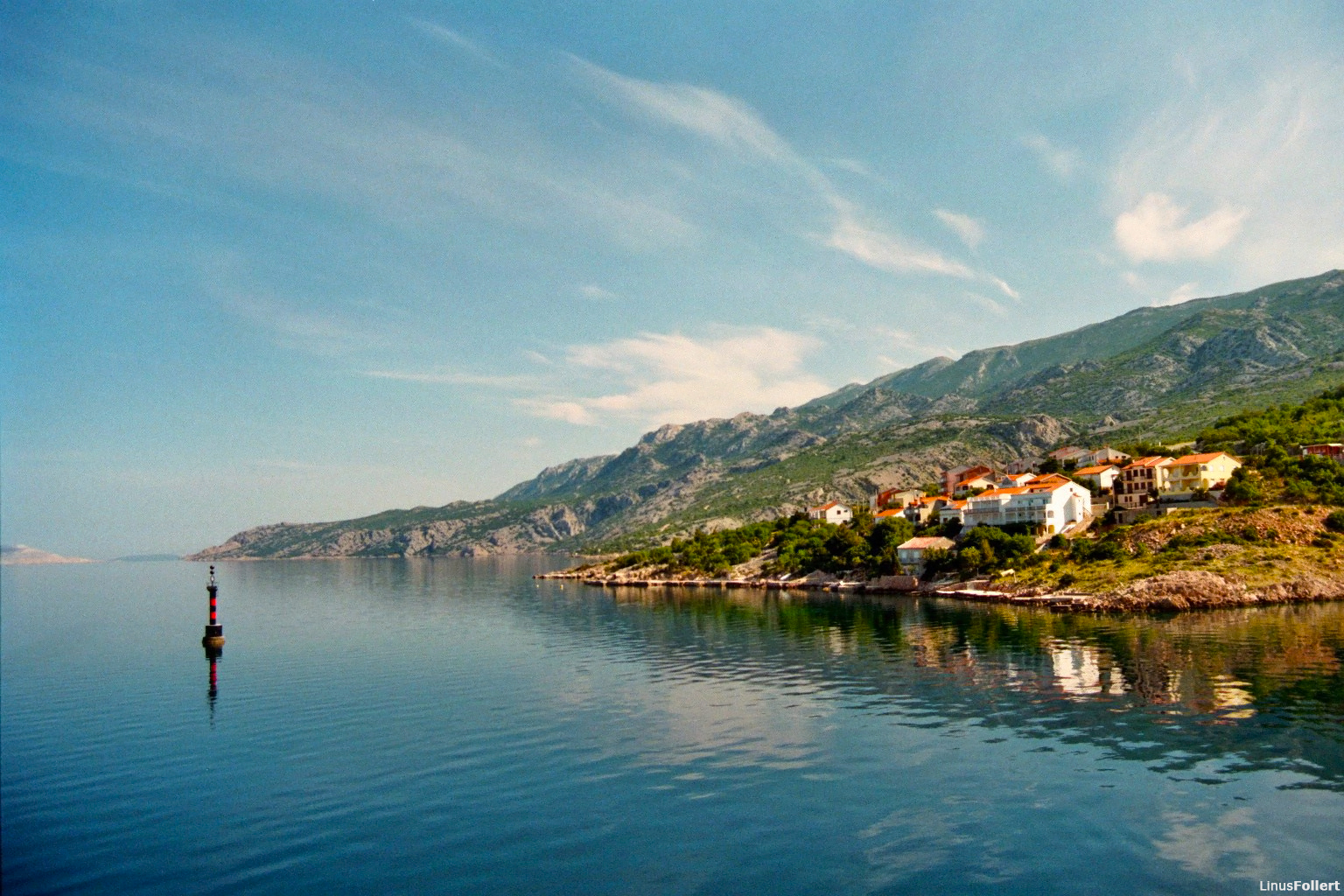
Starigrad underneath Velebit

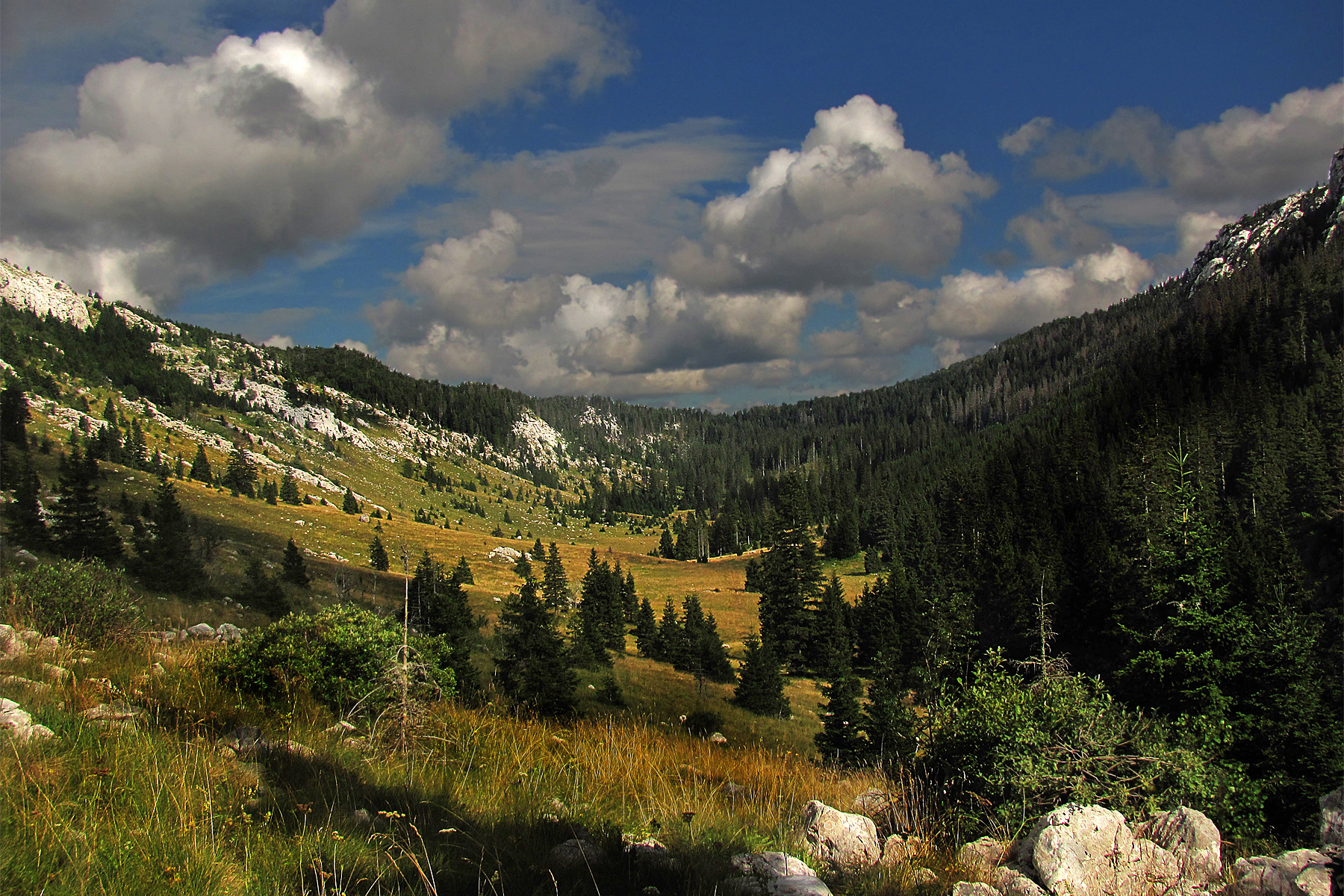
Lomska uvala

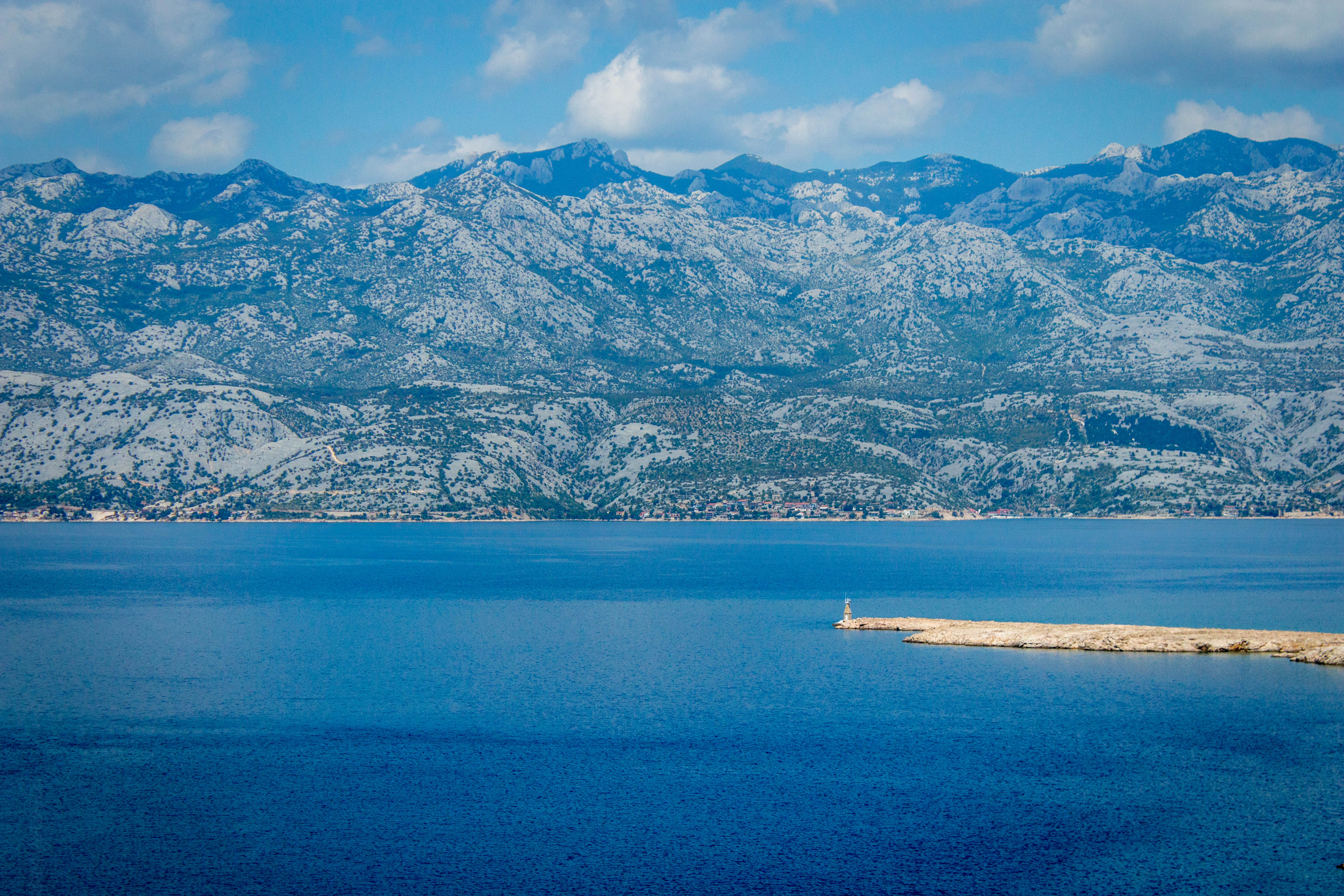
Velebit seen from Pag island

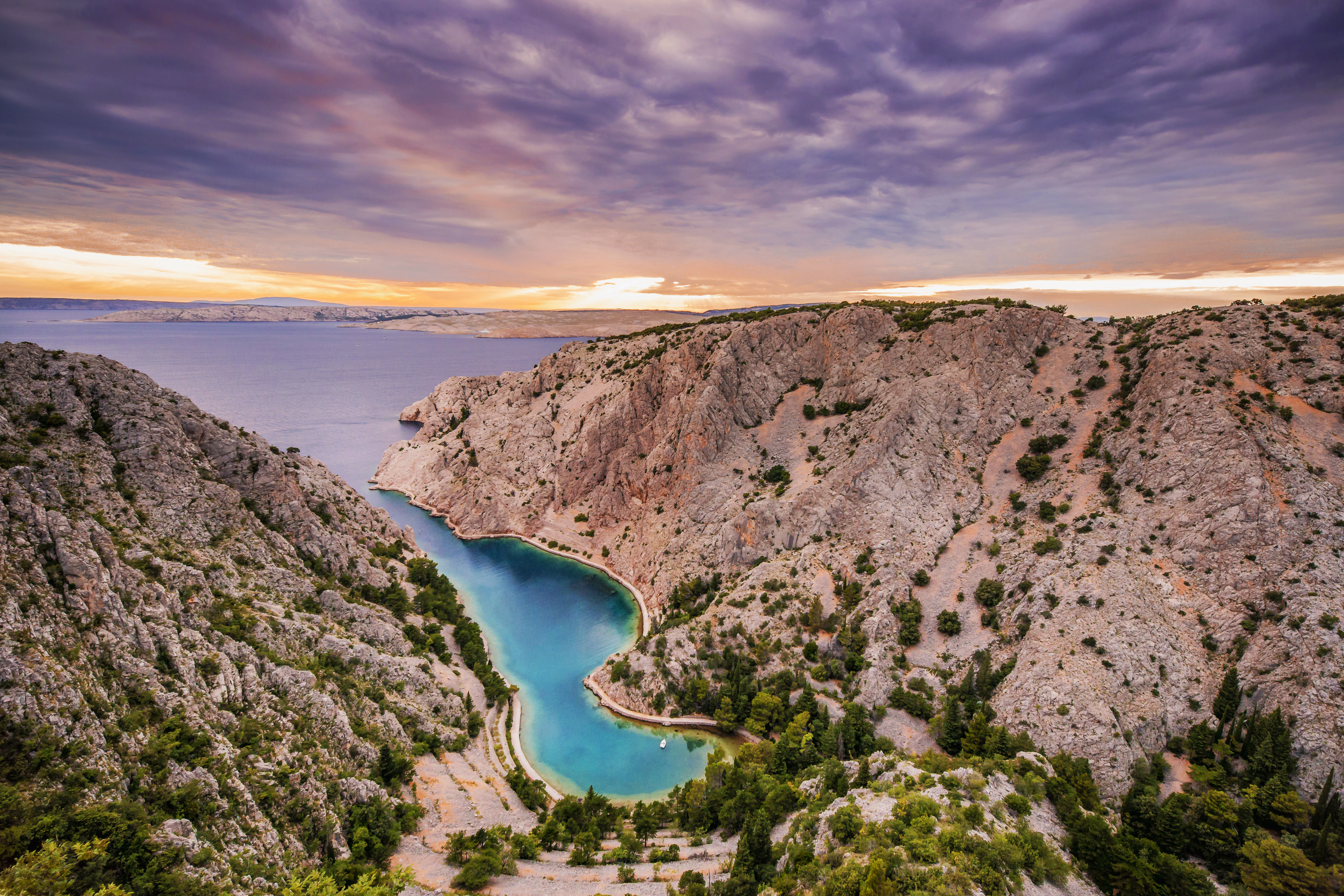
Zavratnica

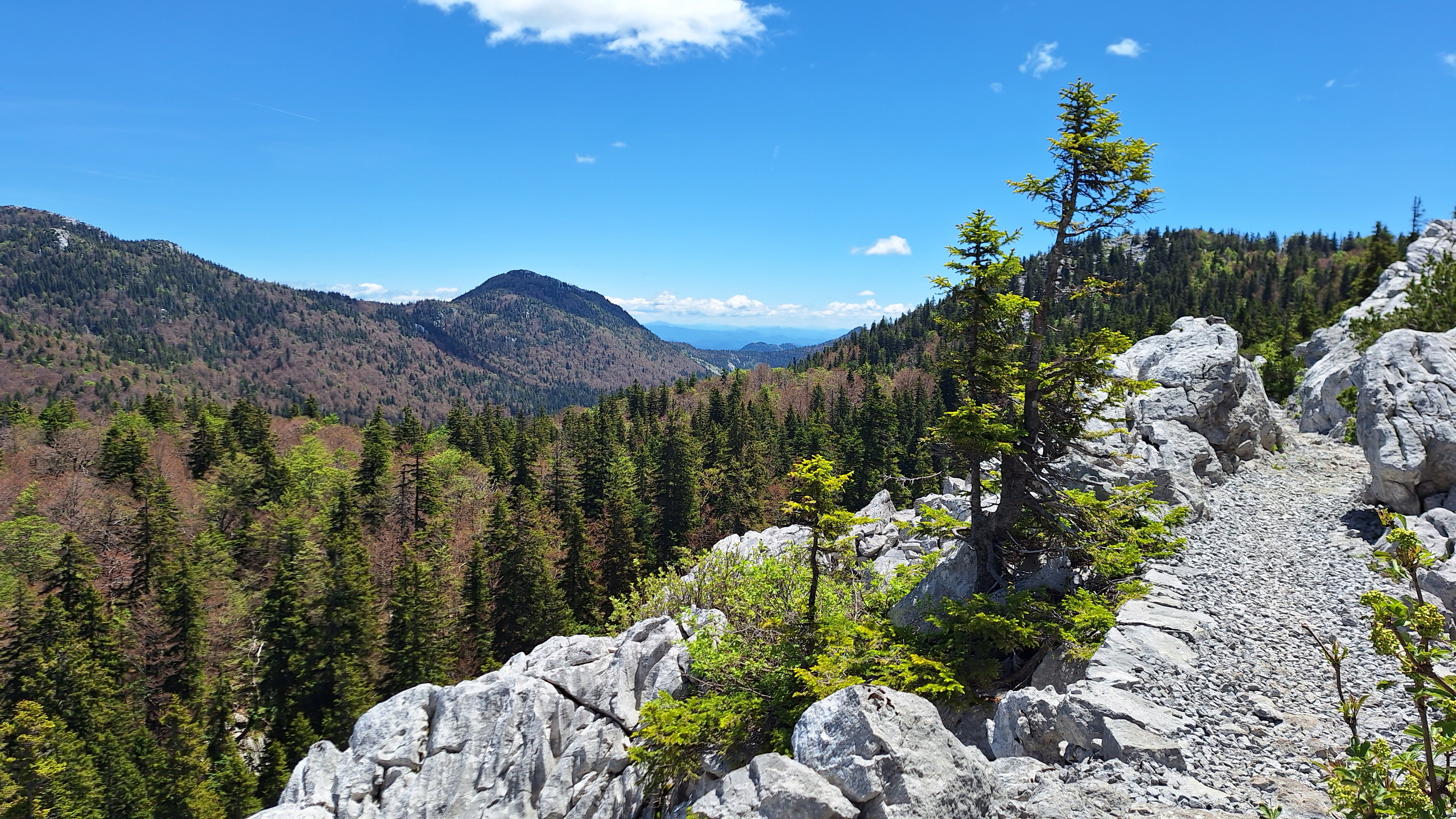
Premužić's pathway

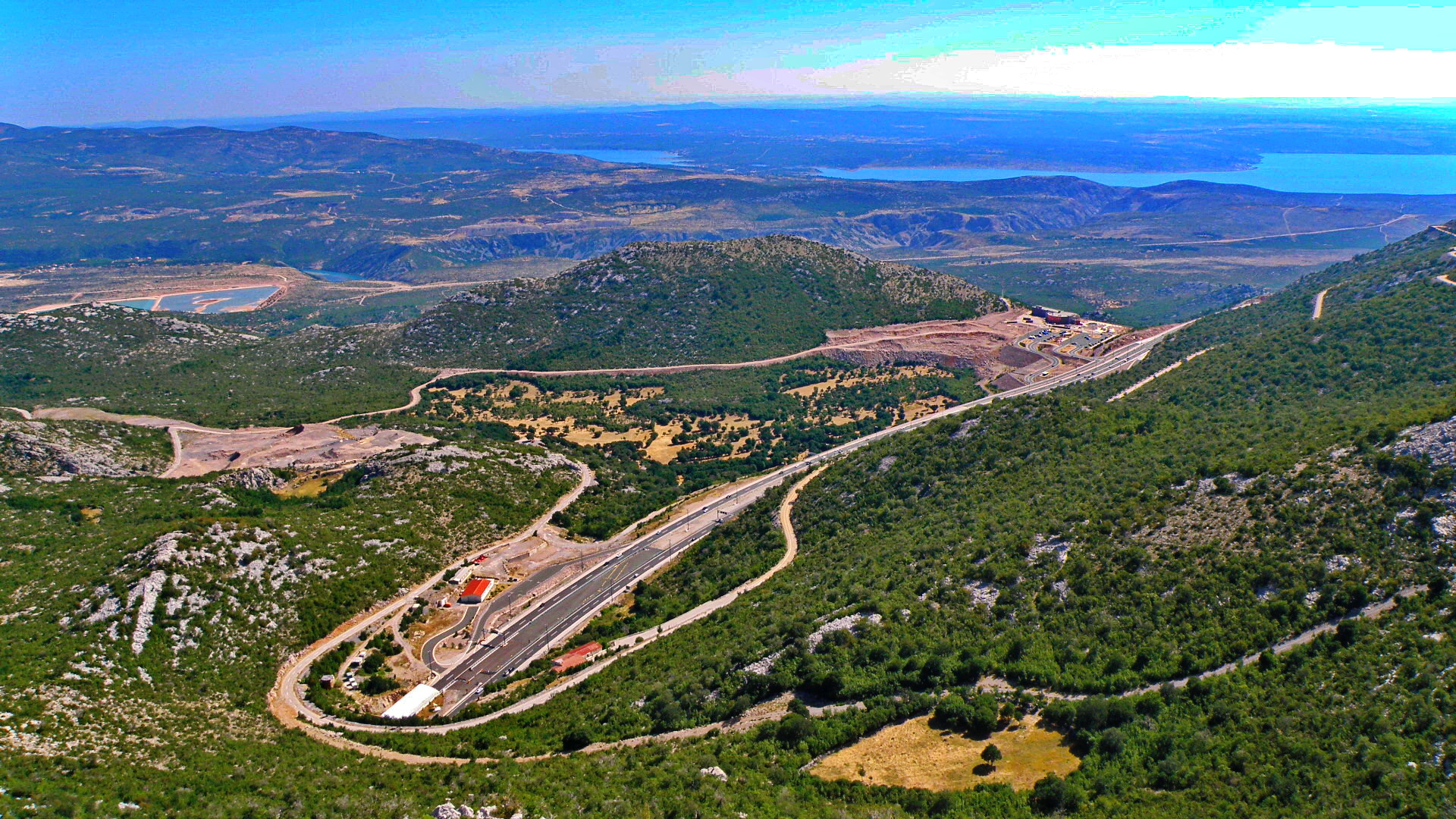
Sveti Rok Tunnel

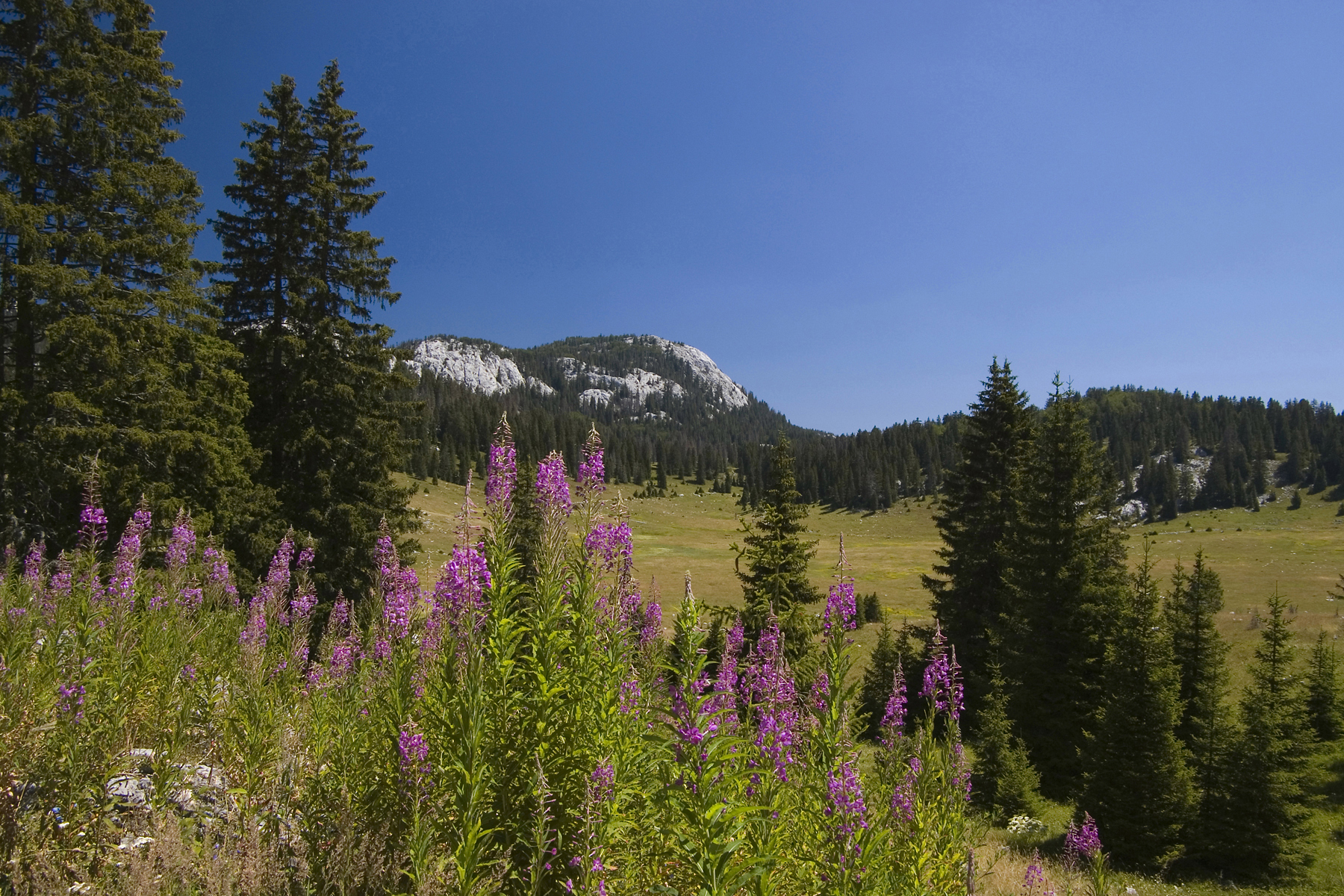
Northern Velebit

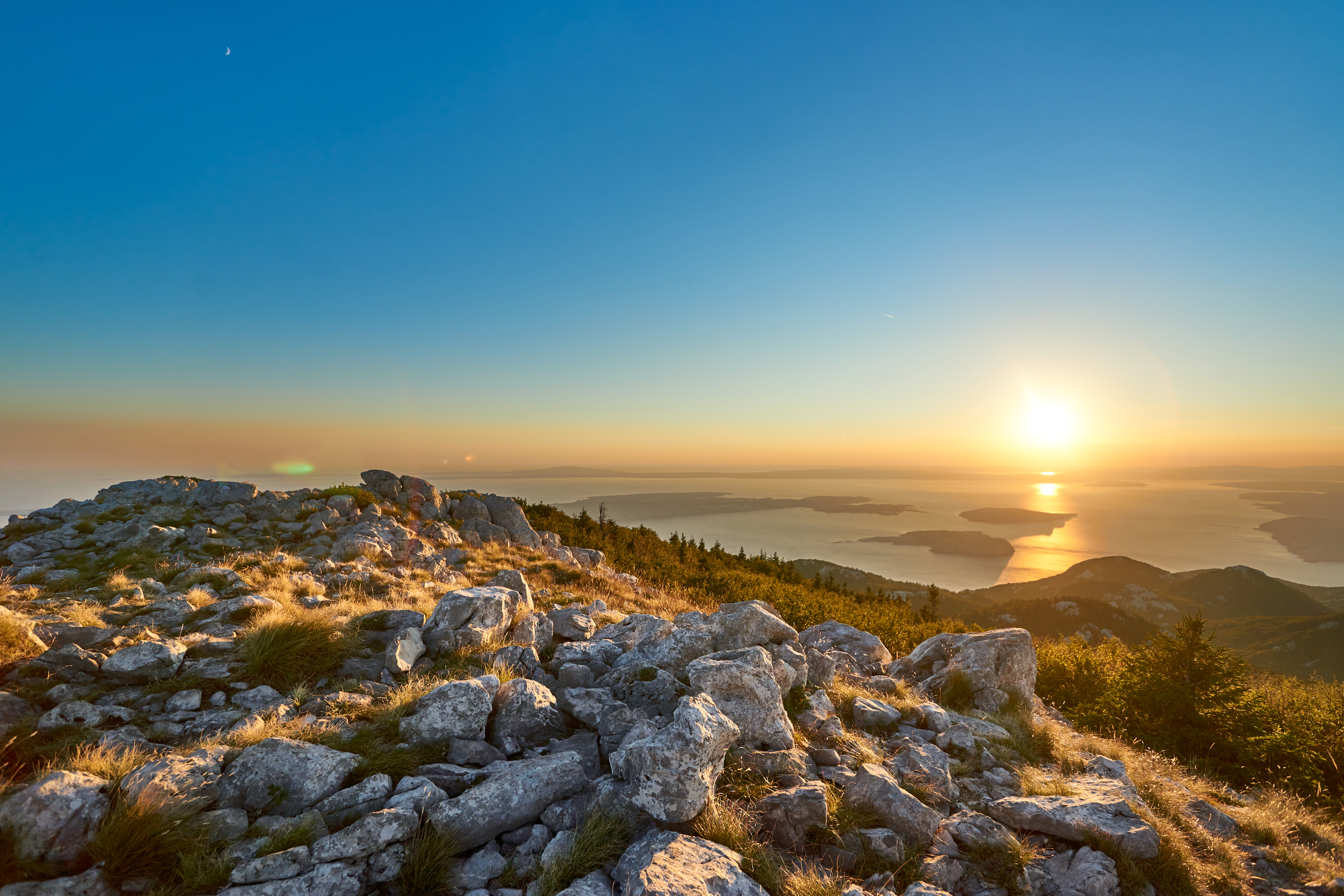
Kvarner Gulf seen from the summit of Velika Koss in northern Velebit in Croatia

== See also ==
- List of mountains in Croatia
- Rewilding Europe
- Tentative list of World Heritage Sites in Croatia
- List of protected areas of Croatia
