= Árpád von Degen =

Hungarian biologist and botanist (1866–1934)

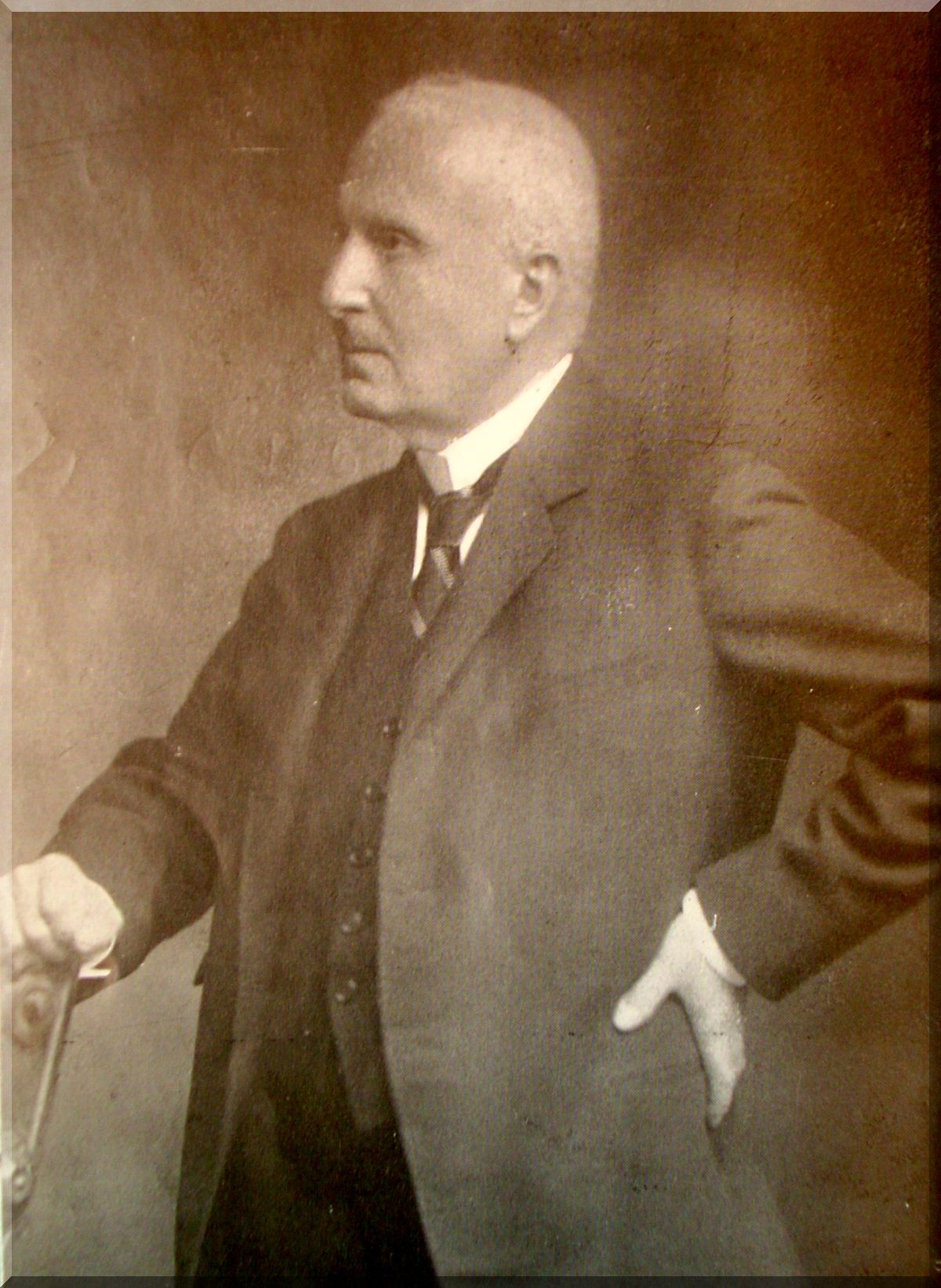
Árpád von Degen

Árpád von Degen (31 March 1866, in Pozsony, Austrian Empire (now Slovakia) – 30 March 1934, in Budapest), was a Hungarian biologist and botanist whose activities were rooted in theoretical principles and scientific botany. Head of the Royal Seed Testing Station in Budapest from 1896, Professor of Botany at the Budapest University from 1927 and member of the Hungarian Academy of Sciences, he died on 30 March 1934 in Budapest.

Dr. Degen traveled in different parts of Europe, the Balkans and Asia Minor, and was the first botanist to make an in-depth study of the Velebit flora, recording about 2.200 types of wild plants. The Degenia velebitica (Degen) Hayek (Brassicaceae) was discovered by him on 17 July 1907. He also described several new species from Albania between the years 1895 and 1897. He had contacts with the Bulgarian tsar Ferdinand and prepared the project for the establishment of the first herbarium at the Natural History Museum in Sofia.

Degen curated and distributed the exsiccata-like specimen series Plantae Banatus exsiccatae a 1894 and later on in his role as Head of the Royal Seed Testing Station in Budapest two other exsiccatae entitled Gramina Hungarica... and Cyperaceae, Juncaceae, Typhaceae et Sparganiaceae Hungaricae exsiccatae.

== Books ==
He wrote over a hundred essays and articles about the European and the Balkan flora and made observations on the characteristics of some oriental herbs.

- Egy új Ajuga fajról: (Ajugæ species nova [A. piskoi].) (1896)
- Wulfenia Baldaccii: Egy új Wulfenia faj a Balcan-félszigetről (1897)
- Nevezetesebb botanikai felfedezések a Balkán félsziget területéről (1901)
- Magyar botanikai lapok (1902)
- Studien über Cuscuta-Arten (1912)
- A heréseinket károsító arankákról (1921)
- A Magyar Tudományos Akadémia szerepe a növénytani tudományok fejlődésében (1933)
- Flora velebitica - 4 vols. Akadémiai Kiadó, Ungarischen Akademie der Wissenschaften (1936–1938)

== See also ==
- International Plant Names Index
