= D39 road (Croatia) =

Road in Croatia

D39 state road

Route information
- Length: 37.3 km (23.2 mi)

Major junctions
- From: Aržano border crossing to Bosnia and Herzegovina
- D60 in Cista Provo; D62 in Šestanovac; A1 in Šestanovac interchange
- To: D8 north of Brela

Location
- Country: Croatia
- Counties: Split-Dalmatia
- Major cities: Šestanovac

Highway system
- Highways in Croatia

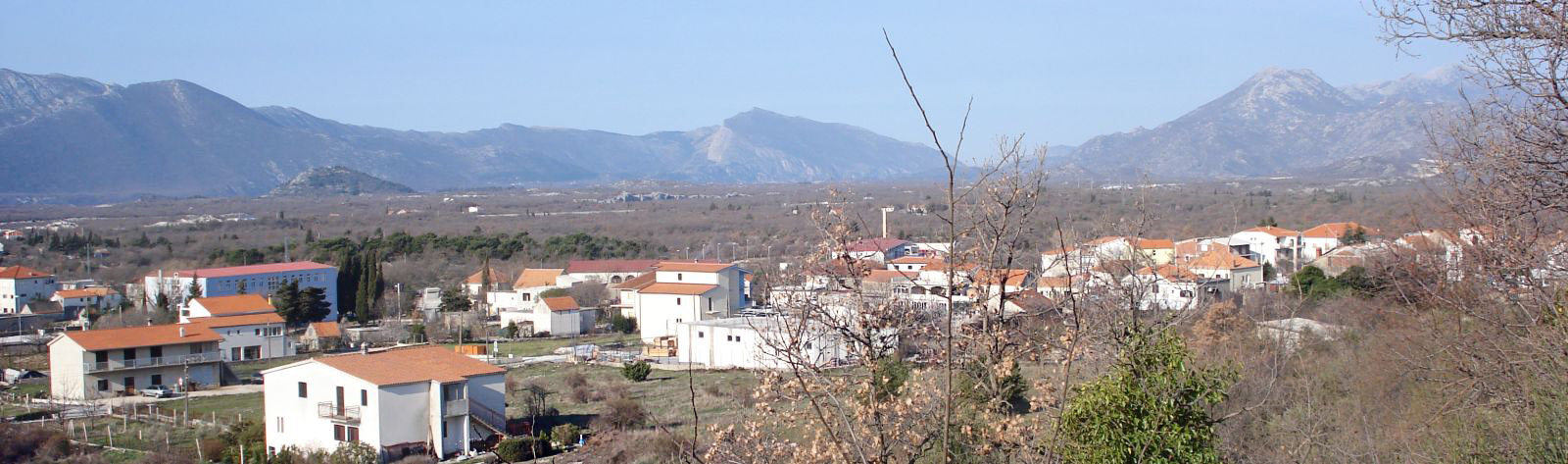
Šestanovac, on the D39 route

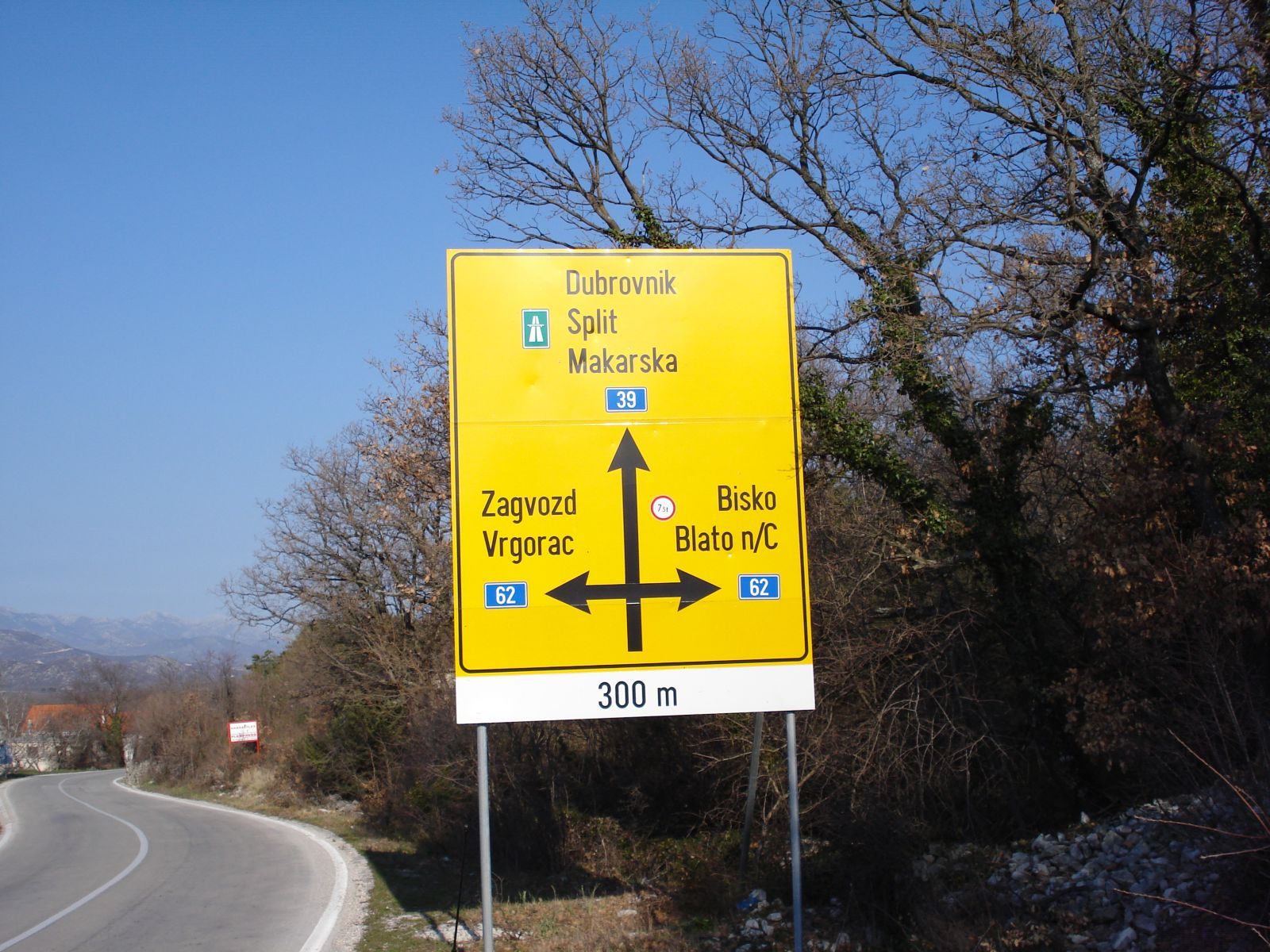
Approach to intersection of D39 and D62

D39 is a state road connecting the Aržano and nearby border crossing to Bosnia and Herzegovina D8 state road north of Brela.

The road also serves as a connecting road to the A1 motorway as it is connected to Šestanovac interchange via a short connector road. The northern terminus of the road is located at Aržano border crossing, providing access to Livno in Bosnia and Herzegovina. The road is 37.3 km (23.2 mi) long.

The road, as well as all other state roads in Croatia, is managed and maintained by Hrvatske ceste, a state-owned company.

== Traffic volume ==
Traffic is regularly counted and reported by Hrvatske ceste, operator of the road. Substantial variations between annual (AADT) and summer (ASDT) traffic volumes are attributed to the fact that the road serves as a connection to the A1 motorway and the D8 state road carrying substantial tourist traffic.

D39 traffic volume
Road	Counting site	AADT	ASDT	Notes
D39	5511 Cista Provo	991	2,086	Adjacent to the D60 junction.
D39	5908 Cista Provo south	1,339	2,760	Adjacent to the Ž6171 junction.
D39	5903 Gornja Brela	2,907	6,372	Adjacent to the Ž6166 junction.

== Road junctions and populated areas ==
D39 junctions/populated areas
Type	Slip roads/Notes
	Aržano border crossing. The road extends into Bosnia and Herzegovina towards Livno. The northern terminus of the road.
	Ž6154 to Gornja Tijarica and Donja Tijarica (D220).
	Aržano; Ž6155 to Studenci and Lovreć (D60).
	Svib
	Cista Provo; D60 to Trilj (to the west) and to Imotski (to the east).
	Ž6171 to Katuni and Kreševo.
	Ž6172 to Žeževica.
	Šestanovac; D62 to Vrgorac and Metković. Ž6260 to Blato na Cetini and Dugopolje.
	A1 in Šestanovac interchange reached via a short connector road. Connection to Split (to the north) and Ploče (to the south).
	Zadvarje
	Ž6166 to Slime and Kučiće.
	Gornja Brela
	D8 to Omiš (to the west) and to Brela and Makarska (to the east). The southern terminus of the road.

== See also ==
- Hrvatske autoceste
