= D60 road =

Road in Croatia

D60 state road

Route information
- Length: 66.1 km (41.1 mi)

Major junctions
- From: D1 in Brnaze
- D220 in Trilj and south of Čaporice; D39 in Cista Provo
- To: Vinjani Donji border crossing

Location
- Country: Croatia
- Counties: Split-Dalmatia
- Major cities: Trilj, Imotski

Highway system
- Highways in Croatia

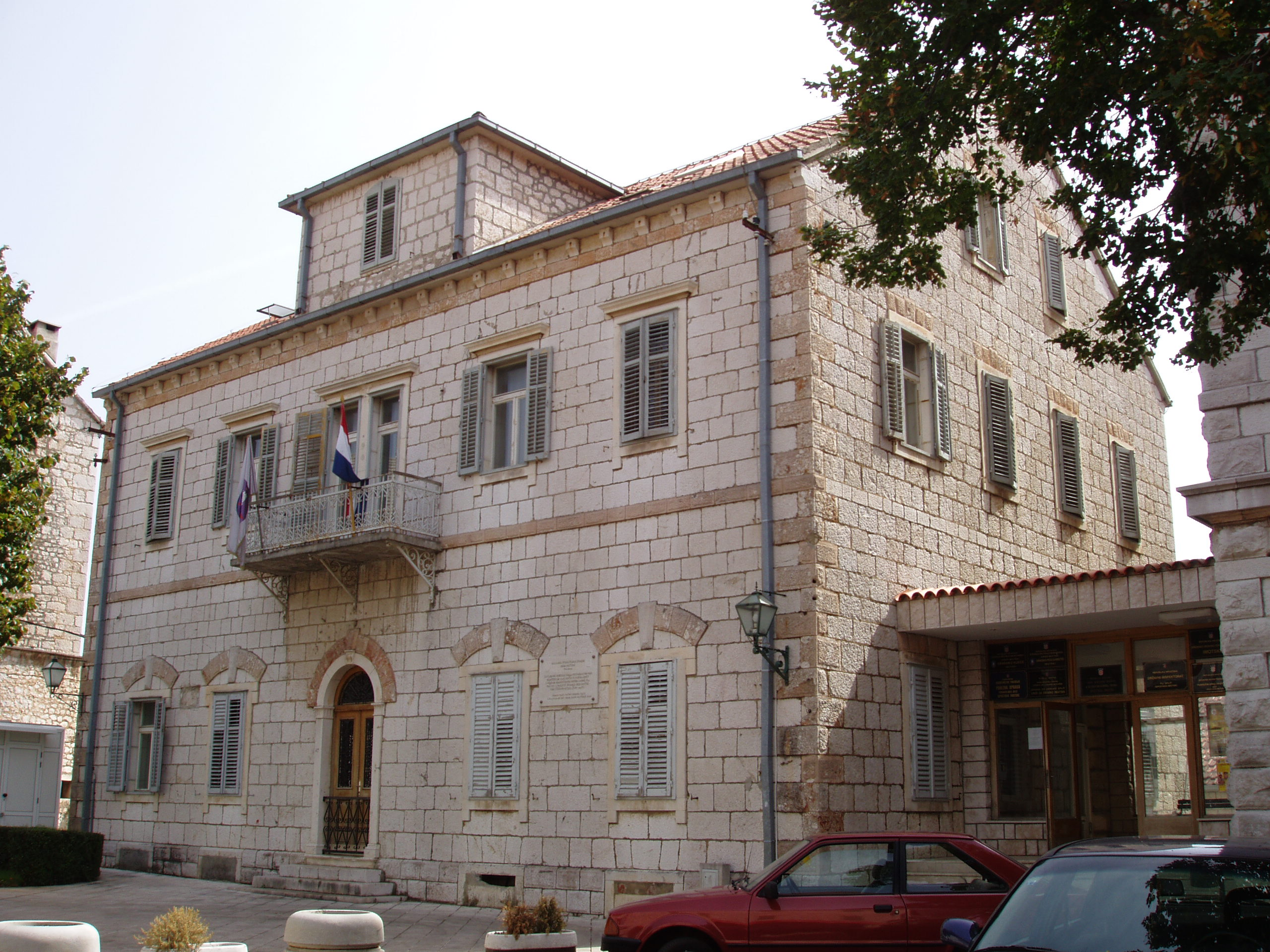
Imotski, on the D60 route

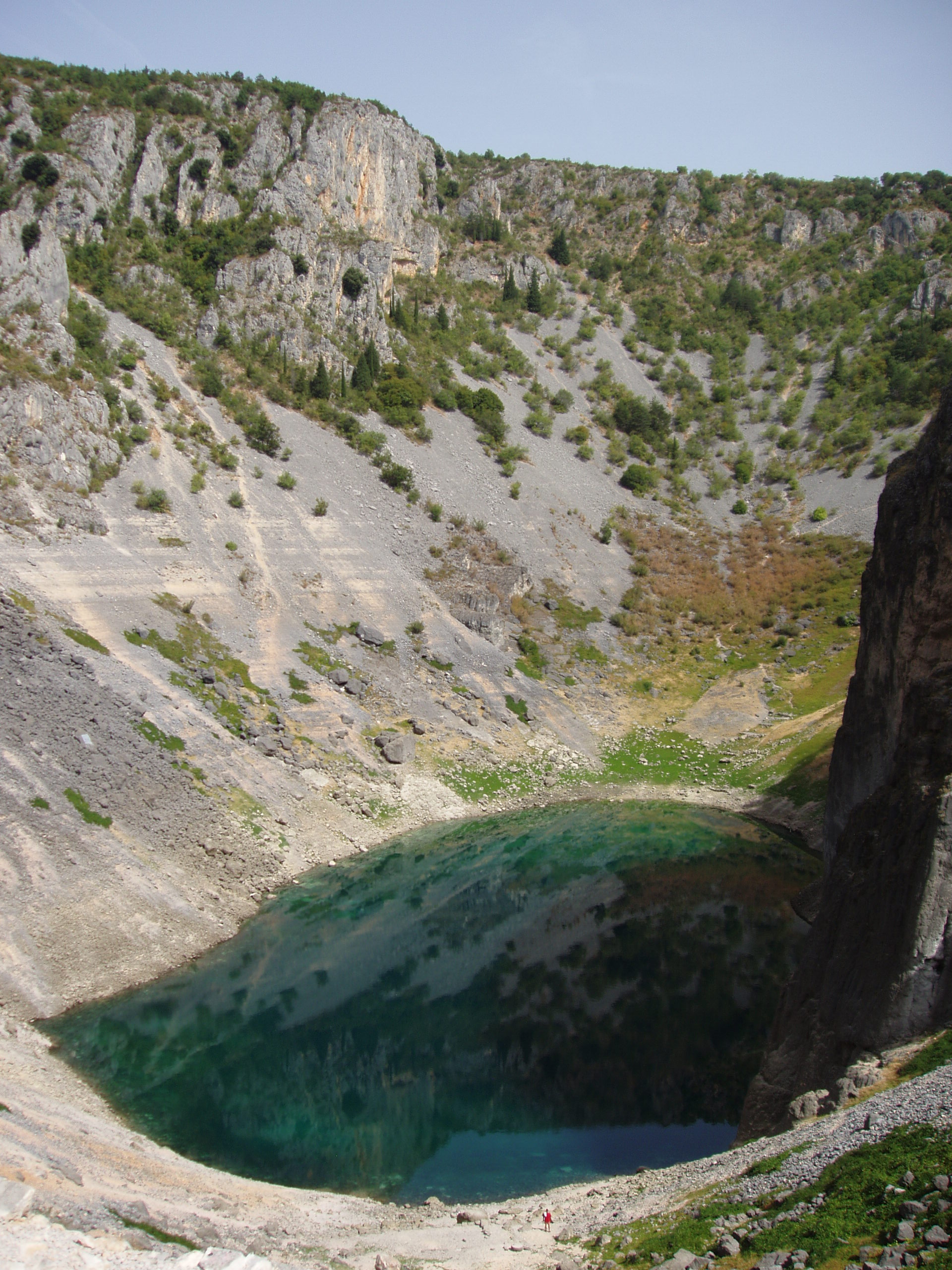
Blue Lake, near Imotski, just to the north of D60

D60 is a state road in Dalmatia region of Croatia connecting D1 state road in Brnaze to Vinjani Donji border crossing to Sovići, Bosnia and Herzegovina via Imotski. The road is 66.1 km (41.1 mi) long.

The road also provides connections to numerous towns and cities in Dalmatian hinterland, most notably to Imotski, Cista Provo, Trilj either directly or via numerous roads connecting to D60. The road also serves traffic to and from other, numerous border crossings to Bosnia and Herzegovina in the area via several county roads connecting to the D60 state road.

The road, as well as all other state roads in Croatia, is managed and maintained by Hrvatske ceste, a state-owned company.

== Traffic volume ==
Traffic is regularly counted and reported by Hrvatske ceste, operator of the road. Substantial variations between annual (AADT) and summer (ASDT) traffic volumes are attributed to the fact that the road serves as a connection to A1 motorway and D1 state road carrying substantial tourist traffic.

D60 traffic volume
Road	Counting site	AADT	ASDT	Notes
D60	5505 Trilj	6,096	8,041	The westernmost traffic counting site on D60.
D60	5510 Cista Velika	2,640	3,161	
D60	5901 Lovreć	2,870	3,580	
D60	6001 Grubine	4,664	5,753	
D60	6012 Vinjani Donji	3,498	4,321	The easternmost traffic counting site on D60.

== Road junctions and populated areas ==
D60 major junctions/populated areas
Type	Slip roads/Notes
	Brnaze; D1 to Sinj and Knin (to the north) and to Dugopolje interchange of A1 motorway and Split (to the south). The western terminus of the road.
	Turjaci
	Ž6124 to Vojnić Sinjski
	Trilj; D220 to Kamensko border crossing to Livno, Bosnia and Herzegovina (to the north). D60 and D220 are concurrent to the east.
	Čaporice
	D220 to Bisko interchange of the A1 motorway (to the south). D60 and D220 are concurrent to the west.
	Ugljane; Ž6149 to Strmec Dolac. Ž6150 to Blato na Cetini.
	Čista Velika
	Ž6153 to Dobranje and Tijarica
	Cista Provo; D39 to Aržano (to the north) and to Šestanovac interchange of the A1 motorway and Brela (to the south).
	Lovreć; Ž6155 to Studenci. Ž6173 to Opanci.
	Ž6179 to Medovdolac and Grabovac.
	Kljenovac; Ž6177 to Lokvičić.
	Grubine; D76 to Makarska and Zagvozd interchange of the A1 motorway.
	Ž6186 to Podbablje.
	Ž6182 to Kamenmost, Zmijavci and Runovići.
	Ž6157 to Glavina Donja and Proložac.
	Imotski; Ž6156 to Ričice. Ž6264 to Vinjani Gornji border crossing to Posušje, Bosnia and Herzegovina.
	Vinjani Donji border crossing to Sovići, Bosnia and Herzegovina.
