= Šestanovac =

Šestanovac may refer to:

- Šestanovac, Croatia, a village and municipality in Split-Dalmatia County
- Šestanovac, Bosnia and Herzegovina, a village near Velika Kladuša
