= Plitvice Lakes incident =

Armed battle at the beginning of the Croatian War of Independence

Coordinates: 44°52′48″N 15°36′36″E

- Part of the Croatian War of Independence
Date	31 March 1991
Location	Plitvice Lakes, Croatia
Result	Croatian victory

Belligerents
Croatia	SAO Krajina

Commanders and leaders
(Croatia) Josip Lucić	Milan Martić

Strength
c. 300 troops	c. 100 troops

Casualties and losses
1 killed 7 wounded	1 killed 13 wounded 29 captured

The Plitvice Lakes incident (Croatian: Krvavi Uskrs na Plitvicama or Plitvički krvavi Uskrs, both translating as "Plitvice Bloody Easter") was an armed clash at the beginning of the Croatian War of Independence. It was fought between Croatian police and armed forces from the Croatian Serb-established SAO Krajina at the Plitvice Lakes in Croatia, on 31 March 1991. The fighting followed the SAO Krajina's takeover of the Plitvice Lakes National Park and resulted in Croatia recapturing the area. The clash resulted in one killed on each side and contributed to the worsening ethnic tensions.

The fighting prompted the Presidency of Yugoslavia to order the Yugoslav People's Army (Jugoslovenska Narodna Armija – JNA) to step in and create a buffer zone between the opposing forces. The JNA arrived at the scene the following day and presented Croatia with an ultimatum requesting the police to withdraw. Even though the special police units which captured the Plitvice Lakes area did pull out on 2 April, a newly established Croatian police station, staffed by 90 officers, remained in place. The police station was blockaded by the JNA three months later, and captured in late August 1991.

== Background ==
In 1990, following the electoral defeat of the government of the Socialist Republic of Croatia, ethnic tensions worsened. The Yugoslav People's Army (Jugoslovenska Narodna Armija – JNA) confiscated Croatia's Territorial Defence (Teritorijalna obrana – TO) weapons to minimize resistance. On 17 August, the tensions escalated into an open revolt of the Croatian Serbs, centred on the predominantly Serb-populated areas of the Dalmatian hinterland around Knin, parts of the Lika, Kordun, Banovina regions and eastern Croatia. They established a Serbian National Council in July 1990, to coordinate opposition to Croatian President Franjo Tuđman's policy of pursuing independence for Croatia. Milan Babić, a dentist from the southern town of Knin, was elected president. Knin's police chief, Milan Martić, established paramilitary militias. The two men eventually became the political and military leaders of the SAO Krajina, a self-declared state incorporating the Serb-inhabited areas of Croatia.

In the beginning of 1991, Croatia had no regular army. In an effort to bolster its defence, Croatia doubled the size of its police force to about 20,000. The most effective part of the force was the 3,000-strong special police that were deployed in 12 battalions adopting military organisation. In addition there were 9,000–10,000 regionally organised reserve police. The reserve police were set up in 16 battalions and 10 companies, but they lacked weapons.

== Prelude ==
In an effort to consolidate territory under their control, Croatian Serb leaders organised a political rally at the Plitvice Lakes on 25 March 1991, demanding the area be annexed to the SAO Krajina. Three days later, on 28 March, SAO Krajina special police seized the area, and with the help of armed civilians, removed the Croatian management of the Plitvice Lakes National Park. The force deployed by the SAO Krajina to the Plitvice Lakes was estimated to be approximately 100-strong. The region was relatively sparsely populated and there was no obvious threat to Serbs there. Journalist Tim Judah suggests that the move may have been motivated by a desire to control a strategic road that ran north–south through the park, linking the Serb communities in the Lika and Banovina regions.

== Croatian deployment ==
Croatian police convoy after the ambush at the Plitvice Lakes, 31 March 1991

Croatia deployed special police forces, specifically the Lučko, Rakitje and Sljeme special police units based in and around Zagreb, supported by additional police forces drawn from Karlovac and Gospić to retake the Plitvice Lakes area. The Croatian police force, commanded by Josip Lucić, used several buses and passenger cars, as well as an armoured personnel carrier, to approach the Plitvice Lakes area. The main 180-strong group of the Rakitje Special Police Unit (SPU), directly commanded by Lucić, arrived in dense fog, along the main road from Zagreb via the Korana River bridge. The bridge was secured by the Lučko unit shortly before midnight on 30/31 March 1991. An auxiliary force approached the Plitvice Lakes via Ličko Petrovo Selo, while the Kumrovec SPU was deployed in the area between the lakes and Gospić, where it captured the Ljubovo Pass to secure the right flank of the main effort. The total attacking force comprised approximately 300 troops.

The approaching convoy was ambushed at a barricade set up by the SAO Krajina force near Plitvice Lakes before 7:00 in the morning of Easter Sunday, 31 March 1991. The SAO Krajina force attacked the vehicles carrying the Croatian police and held their position until they fell back to the national park post office two and a half hours later. The Croatian advance, additionally hindered by deep snow, was achieved at a cost of six wounded. The attacking force secured its objectives by 11:00 am. As the attacking operation reached its completion, the Croatian military sustained its first combat fatality of the Croatian War of Independence, when Josip Jović was killed by a machine gun covering retreating SAO Krajina troops. Shortly afterwards, the Yugoslav Air Force dispatched a Mil Mi-8 helicopter to attend to wounded on both sides, and it left the area after an hour and a half. The helicopter was dispatched by Colonel General Anton Tus, head of the Yugoslav Air Force at the time, following a request by Josip Boljkovac, Interior Minister of Croatia. As the fighting around Plitvice ended, sporadic gunfire was reported near Titova Korenica, to the south. The same afternoon, a Croatian police station was established at the Plitvice Lakes and Tomislav Iljić was appointed its commanding officer. The station was staffed by approximately 90 police officers who were redeployed from Gospić.

The Presidency of Yugoslavia met in an emergency session the same evening to discuss the clash. At the insistence of Serbia's representative on the Presidency, Borisav Jović, the JNA was ordered to intervene, gain control in the area and prevent further combat. The Serbian parliament also met in an emergency session, treating the clashes as a virtual casus belli and voting to offer the Krajina Serbs "all necessary help" in their conflict with Zagreb. The following day, the SAO Krajina adopted a resolution to the effect that the territory was incorporated into Serbia, whose constitution and laws were adopted for use in the Serb-held areas of Croatia. Croatian authorities accused Serbia's president, Slobodan Milošević, of stage-managing the unrest in order to break Croatia's resolve to declare independence unless Yugoslavia was transformed into a loose confederation. They also accused him of attempting to coax the JNA to overthrow Croatian government.

== JNA intervention ==
On 1 April, the JNA established a buffer zone to separate the belligerents at Plitvice Lakes, deploying elements of the 1st and the 5th Military Districts. Those were an armoured battalion of the 329th Armoured Brigade based in Banja Luka, a battalion of the 6th Mountain Brigade based in Delnice, a reconnaissance company and a mechanised battalion of the 4th Armoured Brigade based in Jastrebarsko and Karlovac, a battalion of the 306th Light Anti-Aircraft Artillery Regiment based in Zagreb, a signals company of the 367th Signals Regiment based in Samobor, a company of the 13th Military Police Battalion based in Rijeka and an anti-aircraft artillery battery drawn from the 13th Proletarian Motorised Brigade based in Rijeka. Finally, the 5th Military District set up a forward command post at the Plitvice Lakes. The JNA force at the Plitvice Lakes was commanded by Colonel Ivan Štimac.

The commanding officer of the 5th Military District, Major General Andrija Rašeta, in overall command of the JNA intervention, told the media that his men were not protecting either side and were there only to prevent ethnic confrontations for an indeterminate period. However, the Croatian government reacted furiously to the JNA move. Tuđman's aide, Mario Nobilo, claimed that the JNA had told Croatian officials that it would engage the police if they did not leave Plitvice. In a radio address, Tuđman said that the JNA would be regarded as a hostile army of occupation if its course of action remained unchanged. On 2 April, the JNA handed the Croatian authorities an ultimatum, requesting the police leave Plitvice. The special police left Plitvice the same day, but the 90 officers staffing the newly established police station remained in place.

== Aftermath ==
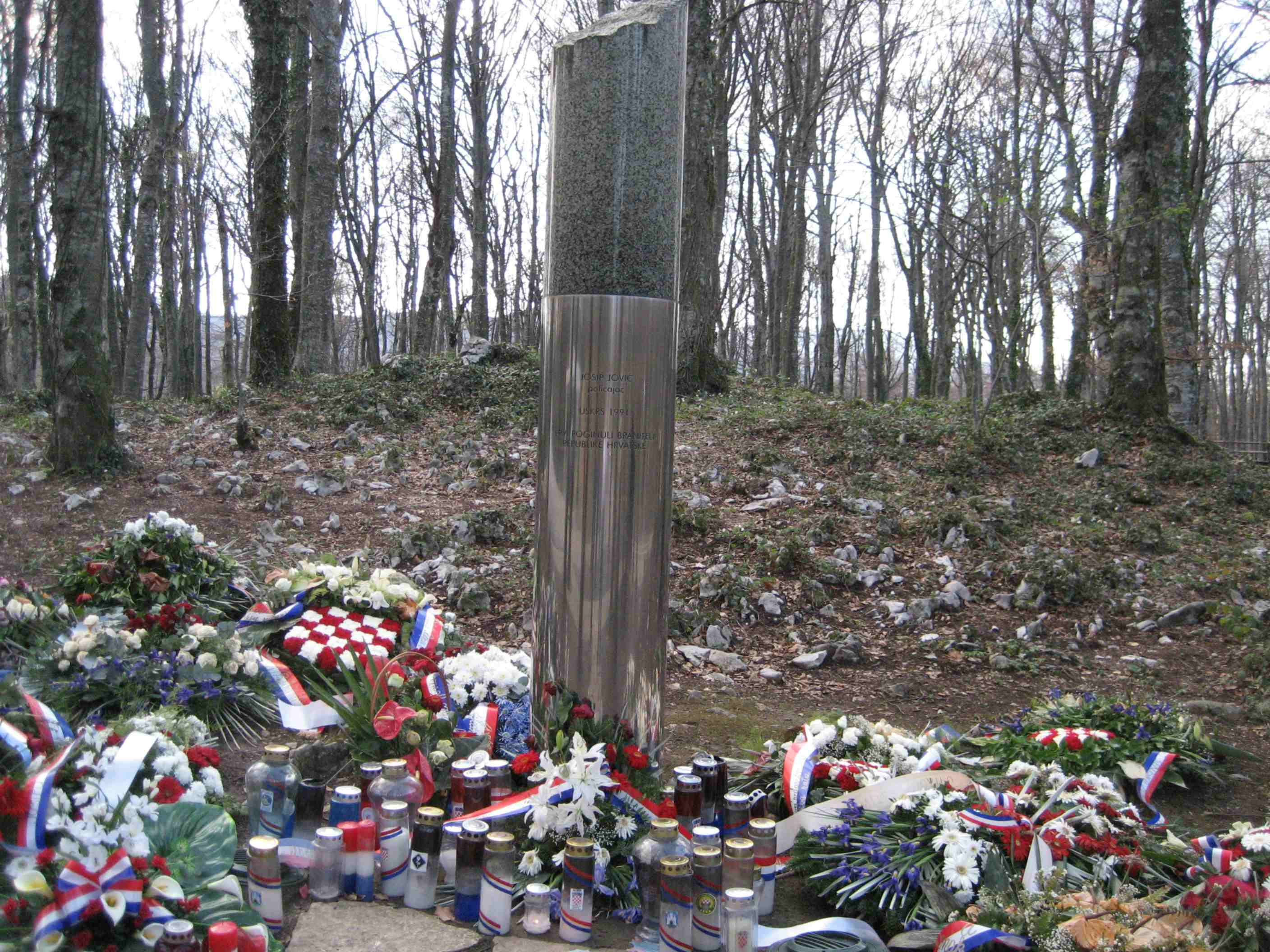
Memorial to Josip Jović, the first Croatian policeman killed in action

Police officer Josip Jović was the only Croatian fatality in the incident. The SAO Krajina force also suffered one killed in the fighting—Rajko Vukadinović, who was the first Croatian Serb combat fatality in the war. A total of 20 people were wounded, seven of whom were the Croatian police. The Croatian forces captured 29 SAO Krajina troops, 18 of whom were formally charged with insurgency. Among the prisoners was Goran Hadžić, later to become the President of the Republic of Serbian Krajina, although he was quickly released. Hadžić's release was explained as a goodwill gesture by the authorities, but Boljkovac claims he was released because he was collaborating with the Croatian authorities in 1991. Approximately 400 tourists, most of them Italian, were evacuated from the Plitvice Lakes after the fighting.

The clash at the Plitvice Lakes worsened the overall situation in Croatia and led to an escalation of the conflict. Even though the Croatian and Serb forces were separated by the JNA at the Plitvice Lakes, the situation in the area continued to deteriorate following the clash. In nearby Plaški, Croatian police personnel left the local police station and were replaced by Serb officers. Both SAO Krajina and Croatian forces set up several roadblocks on the Saborsko–Lička Jasenica–Ogulin road. By summer, the blockades were extended to the north of Plaški and south of Saborsko, where Croatian authorities established another 30-strong police station on 2 April. Only JNA vehicles were permitted to pass the roadblocks, and that brought about a shortage of food, medicine and electricity in the area.

On 2 May, the Serb Democratic Party, the ruling party in the SAO Krajina, organised a protest march to the Plitvice Lakes and a political rally demanding the Croatian police withdraw from Plitvice. The march, led by Babić and Vojislav Šešelj, was prevented from reaching the Plitvice Lakes by the JNA and forced to return to Titova Korenica. The JNA imposed a blockade of the Plitvice Lakes police station on 1 July, on the pretext that the Croatian police had abducted and imprisoned two JNA officers. By 6 July, the SAO Krajina forces and the JNA commenced attacks on the Ljubovo Pass southeast of the Plitvice Lakes, on the Titova Korenica–Gospić road, driving the Croatian National Guard back and capturing the pass by the end of the month. Throughout the summer, the JNA continued to engage Croatian forces in Lika using the units deployed to the Plitvice Lakes in April. The fighting escalated further on 30 August, when the JNA captured the Plitvice Lakes police station and the following day when the Battle of Gospić began.

== Legacy ==
Jović is largely viewed in Croatia as the first casualty of the Croatian War of Independence. A monument dedicated to him was erected in his birthplace of Aržano in 1994. After the war, a monument was erected at the site of his death, where annual commemorations of the clash are held. The clash and Jović's death are commemorated annually at the Plitvice Lakes.

== Sources ==
=== Books ===
- Armatta, Judith (2010). Twilight of Impunity: The War Crimes Trial of Slobodan Milosevic. Durham, North Carolina: Duke University Press. ISBN 978-0-82234746-0.
- Bennett, Christopher (1995). Yugoslavia's Bloody Collapse: Causes, Course and Consequences. London, England: C. Hurst & Co. ISBN 9781850652328.
- Central Intelligence Agency, Office of Russian and European Analysis (2002). Balkan Battlegrounds: A Military History of the Yugoslav Conflict, 1990–1995. Washington, D.C.: Central Intelligence Agency. OCLC 50396958.
- Crnobrnja, Mihailo (1996). The Yugoslav Drama. Montreal, Quebec: McGill-Queen's University Press. ISBN 9780773566156.
- Goldstein, Ivo (1999). Croatia: A History. Montreal, Quebec: McGill-Queen's University Press. ISBN 9780773520172.
- Grandits, Hannes; Leutloff, Carolin (2003). "Discourses, Actors, Violence: The Organisation of War-Escalation in the Krajina Region of Croatia 1990–91". In Koehler, Jan; Zürcher, Christoph (eds.). Potentials of Disorder: Explaining Conflict and Stability in the Caucasus and in the Former Yugoslavia. Manchester, England: Manchester University Press. pp. 23–45. ISBN 9780719062414.
- Hoare, Marko Attila (2010). "The War of Yugoslav Succession". In Ramet, Sabrina P. (ed.). Central and Southeast European Politics Since 1989. Cambridge, England: Cambridge University Press. pp. 111–136. ISBN 978-1-139-48750-4.
- Judah, Tim (2009). The Serbs: History, Myth and the Destruction of Yugoslavia. New Haven, Connecticut: Yale University Press. ISBN 9780300158267.
- Meier, Viktor (2013). Yugoslavia: A History of its Demise. London, England: Routledge. ISBN 9781134665105.
- Mesić, Stjepan (2004). The Demise of Yugoslavia: A Political Memoir. Budapest, Hungary: Central European University Press. ISBN 978-963-9241-81-7.
- Nazor, Ante (2007). Počeci suvremene hrvatske države: kronologija procesa osamostaljenja Republike Hrvatske: od Memoranduma SANU 1986. do proglašenja neovisnosti 8. listopada 1991 [Beginnings of the Modern Croatian State: A Chronology of the Independence of the Republic of Croatia: from 1986 SANU Memorandum to the Declaration of Independence on 8 October 1991] (in Croatian). Zagreb, Croatia: Croatian Homeland War Memorial Documentation Centre. ISBN 9789537439019.
- Petković, T. (2007). "Odelenju bezbednosti KRV i PVO, Sumarni izveštaj za 02.04.1991.g." [To Security Department of the Air Force and Air Defence Command, Summary Report for 2 April 1991]. In Rupić, Mate (ed.). Republika Hrvatska i domovinski rat 1990.-1995., dokumenti, knjiga 1 [Republic of Croatia and the Croatian War of Independence 1991–95, Documents, Volume 1] (PDF) (in Serbian). Zagreb, Croatia: Croatian Memorial-Documentation Centre of the Homeland War. pp. 102–104. ISBN 9789537439033. Archived from the original (PDF) on 26 November 2016.
- Repe, Božo (2009). "Balkan Wars". In Forsythe, David P. (ed.). Encyclopedia of Human Rights, Volume 1. Oxford, England: Oxford University Press. pp. 138–147. ISBN 978-0-19-533402-9.
- Wachtel, Andrew; Bennett, Christopher (2012). "The Dissolution of Yugoslavia". In Ingrao, Charles W.; Thomas Allan Emmert (eds.). Confronting the Yugoslav Controversies: A Scholars' Initiative. West Lafayette, Indiana: Purdue University Press. pp. 13–47. ISBN 978-1-55753-533-7.

=== Scientific journal articles ===
- Marijan, Davor (December 2006). "Djelovanje JNA i pobunjenih Srba u Lici 1990.-1992. godine" [Activities of the JNA and rebel Serbs in Lika in 1991–1992]. The Review of Senj (in Croatian). 33 (1). City Museum Senj – Senj Museum Society. ISSN 0582-673X.

=== News reports ===
- Capar, Luka (29 March 2013). "Obljetnica: 'Krvavi Uskrs' na Plitvicama 1991. godine" [Anniversary: "Bloody Easter" at Plitvice, 1991]. Večernji list (in Croatian). ISSN 1333-9192. Archived from the original on 14 October 2013.
- Capar, Luka (31 March 2013). "Obljetnica: Josip Jović – prva žrtva Domovinskog rata" [Anniversary: Josip Jović – the First Victim of the Croatian War of Independence]. Večernji list (in Croatian). ISSN 1333-9192. Archived from the original on 13 October 2013.
- Dukić, Snježana (30 March 2001). "Na okruglom stolu i general Ivan Štimac koji je zapovijedao tenkovima JNA na Plitvicama!" [General Ivan Štimac who Commanded JNA Tanks at Plitvice Attends Roundtable!]. Slobodna Dalmacija (in Croatian). ISSN 1333-9192. Archived from the original on 29 October 2013.
- "Obilježena 21. obljetnica akcije "Plitvice" i pogibije Josipa Jovića" [The 21st Anniversary of the Operation Plitvice and Death of Josip Jović Marked]. Novi list (in Croatian). HINA. 31 March 2012. ISSN 1334-1545. Archived from the original on 1 April 2012.
- Perica, Silvana; Bičak, Snježana (30 May 2011). "Boljkovac: Goran Hadžić bio je mirotvorac, surađivao je 1991" [Boljkovac: Goran Hadžić was a Peacemaker, he Collaborated in 1991]. Večernji list (in Croatian). ISSN 1333-9192. Archived from the original on 29 October 2013.
- Radoš, Ivica (30 March 2006). "Obljetnica krvavog Uskrsa 1991.: Posljednje riječi su mu bile: 'Tata, tata'" [1991 Bloody Easter Anniversary: His Last Words were: Dad, Dad]. Jutarnji list (in Croatian). ISSN 1331-5692. Archived from the original on 29 October 2013.
- "Roads Sealed as Yugoslav Unrest Mounts". The New York Times. Reuters. 19 August 1990. ISSN 0362-4331. Archived from the original on 21 September 2013.
- Sudetic, Chuck (1 April 1991). "Deadly Clash in a Yugoslav Republic". The New York Times. ISSN 0362-4331. Archived from the original on 14 June 2013.
- Vidović, Iva (31 March 2013). "Branitelji se povukli sa skupa na Plitvicama: Gdje je predsjednik?!" [Veterans Pull Out of the Plitivce Event: Where is the President?!]. Večernji list (in Croatian). ISSN 1333-9192. Archived from the original on 14 October 2013.

=== Other sources ===
- "In memoriam: Josip Jović" (in Croatian). Ministry of the Interior (Croatia). 29 March 2011. Archived from the original on 27 April 2014.
- Nazor, Ante (October 2012). "Krvavi Uskrs – Akcija Plitvice" [Bloody Easter – Operation Plitvice]. Hrvatski vojnik (in Croatian) (407). Ministry of Defence (Croatia). ISSN 1333-9036. Archived from the original on 2014-04-27.
- "The Prosecutor vs. Milan Martic – Judgement" (PDF). International Criminal Tribunal for the former Yugoslavia. 12 June 2007.
- Žužul, Marija (2010). "Josip Jović – Prva žrtva Domovinskog rata" [Josip Jović – The First Victim of the Croatian War of Independence]. In Kreš, Marija (ed.). Policija u Domovinskom ratu 1990.-1991 [Police in the Croatian War of Independence 1990–1991] (PDF) (in Croatian). Ministry of the Interior (Croatia). pp. 21–27. Archived from the original (PDF) on 2017-07-03.
