= Bisko =

- Village
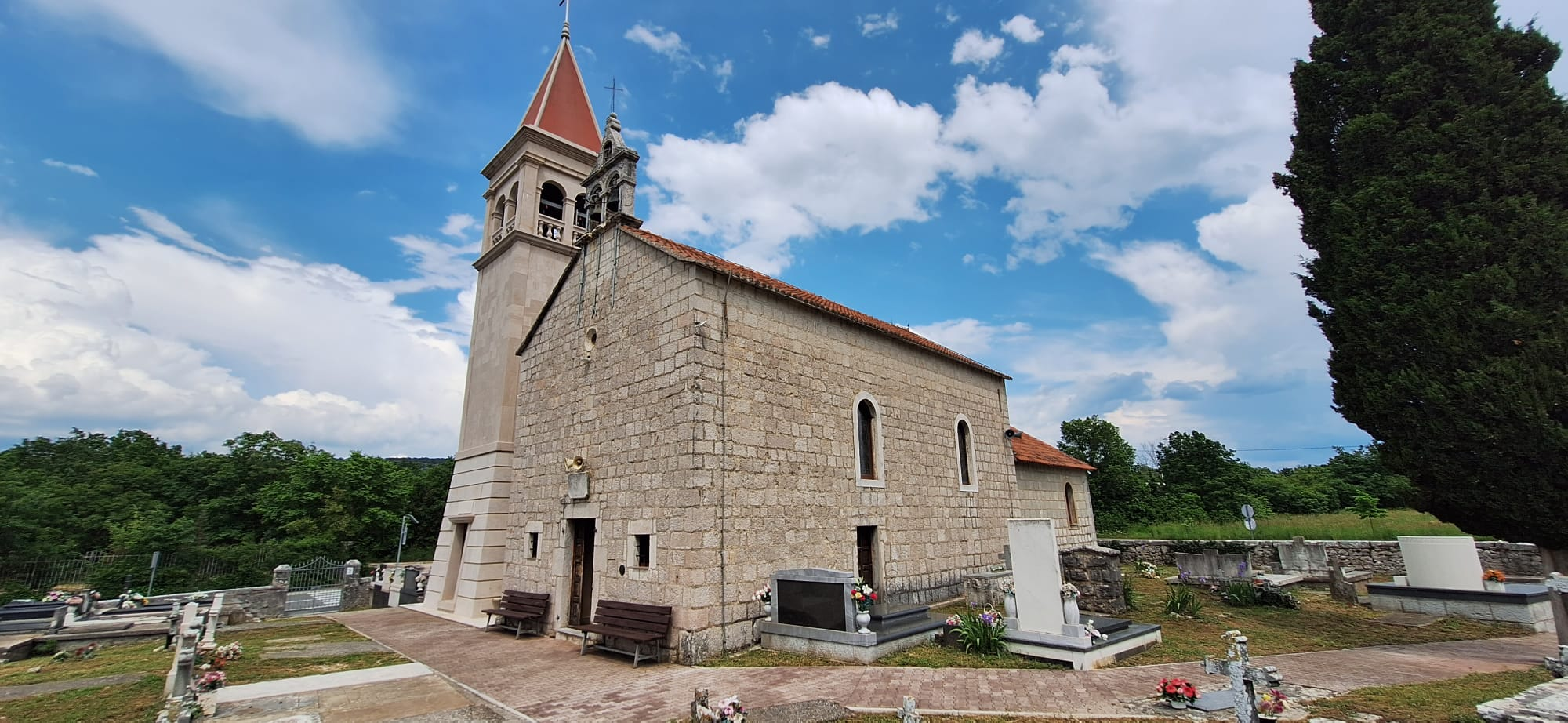
- Church of St. Michael in Bisko.

- Location within Split-Dalmatia County Location within Croatia
- Coordinates: 43°34′48″N 16°40′55″E
- Country: Croatia

Area
  - Total: 13.6 km^{2} (5.3 sq mi)

Population (2021)
  - Total: 351
  - Density: 25.8/km^{2} (66.8/sq mi)
- Time zone: UTC+1 (CET)
  - Summer (DST): UTC+2 (CEST)

Bisko is a village in Croatia. It is connected by the D220 highway.
