= D220 road =

Road in Croatia

D220 state road

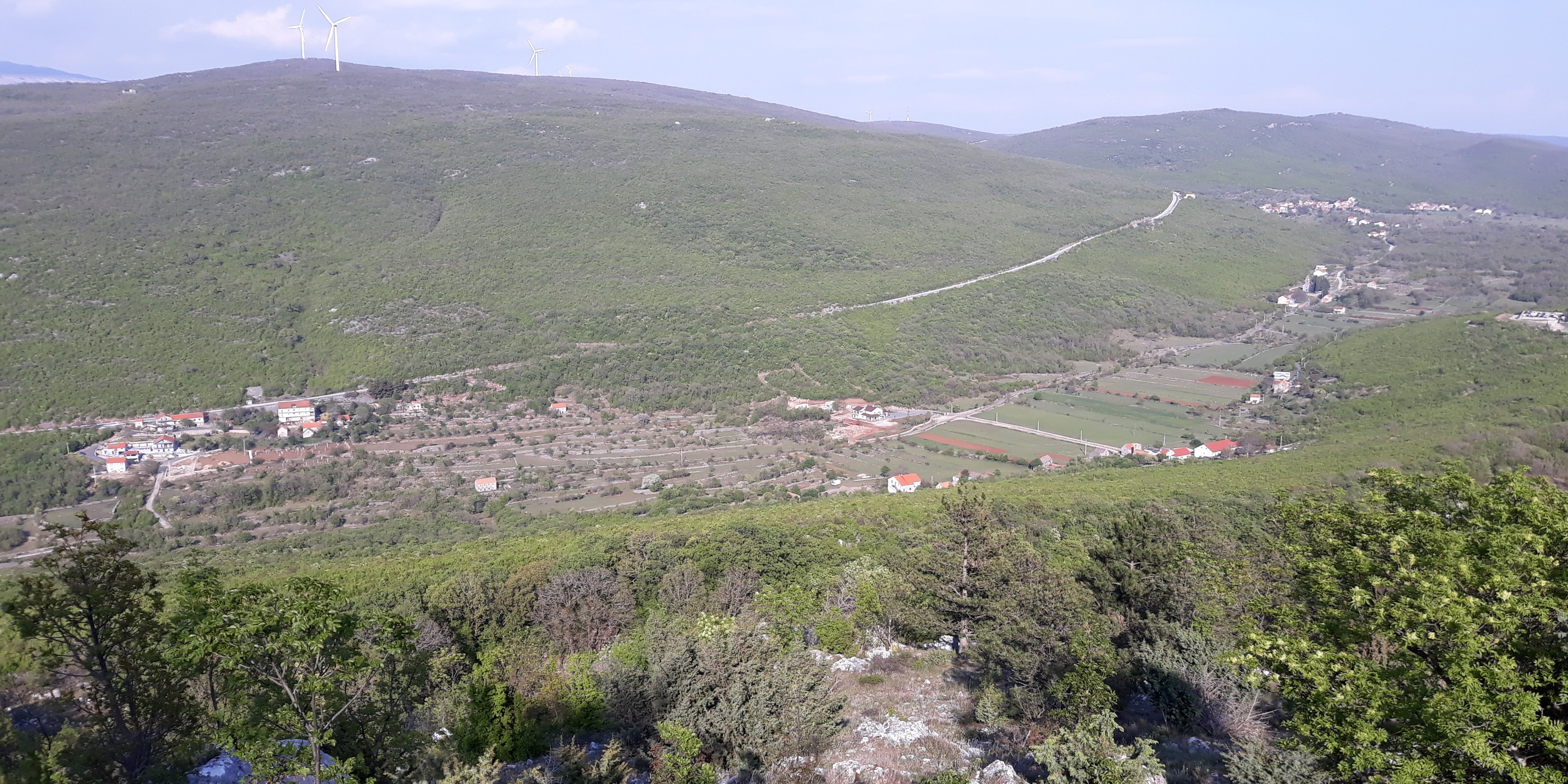

Route information
- Length: 28.9 km (18.0 mi)

Major junctions
- From: A1 in Bisko interchange
- D60 in Trilj
- To: Kamensko border crossing to Bosnia and Herzegovina

Location
- Country: Croatia
- Counties: Split-Dalmatia
- Major cities: Trilj

Highway system
- Highways in Croatia

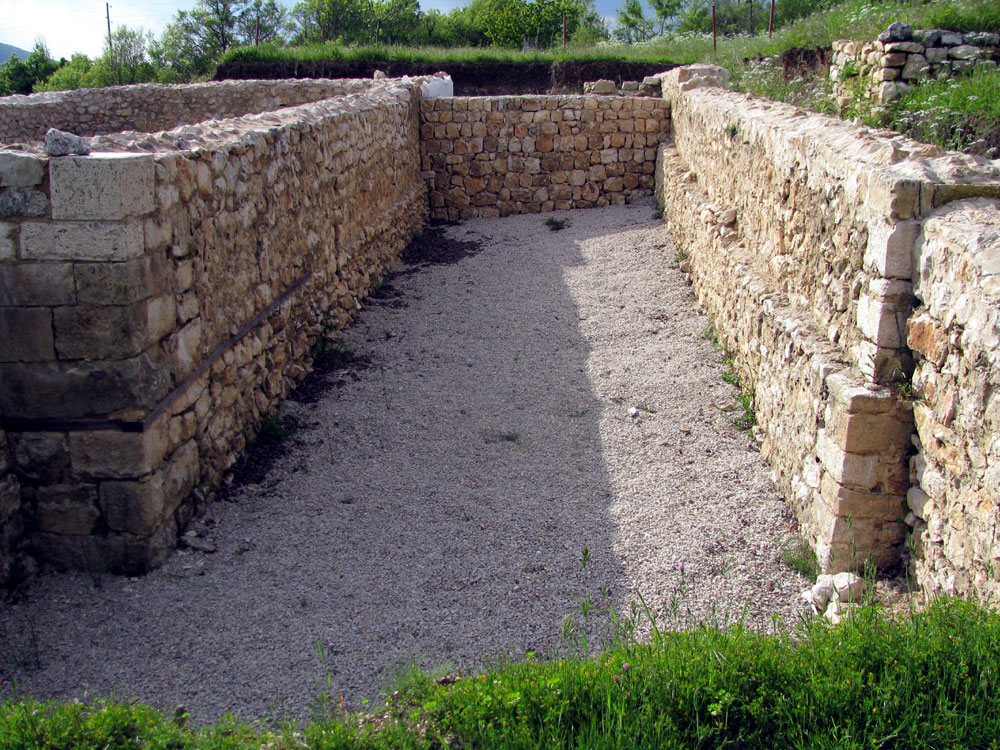
Tilurij, Roman military camp, near Trilj, next to the D220 road

D220 is a state road in the central Dalmatia region of Croatia that connects the A1 motorway's Bisko interchange to the D60 state road, facilitating access from A1 motorway to Imotski via D60 state road and to Kamensko border crossing to Livno, Bosnia and Herzegovina. The road is 28.9 km (18.0 mi) long.

The southern part of the road, is executed as a four-lane expressway, comprising A1 motorway junction and an interchange providing access to Ž6260 county road which runs parallel to the A1 motorway. In the central part of the road, between Čaporice and Trilj, D220 and D60 are concurrent.

Like all state roads in Croatia, the D220 is also managed and maintained by Hrvatske ceste, state owned company.

== Traffic volume ==
Traffic is regularly counted and reported by Hrvatske ceste, operator of the road. Substantial variations between annual (AADT) and summer (ASDT) traffic volumes are attributed to the fact that the road serves as a connection to A1 motorway carrying substantial tourist traffic.

D220 traffic volume
Road	Counting site	AADT	ASDT	Notes
D220	5520 Čaporice	3,564	4,430	Between Ž6260 and D60 junctions.
D220	5506 Kamensko	1,864	2,951	Between Ž6125 and L67104 junctions.

== Road junctions ==
D220 major junctions/populated areas
Type	Slip roads/Notes
	Bisko interchange. A1 Split to the north and to Zagvozd and Ploče to the south.
	Bisko toll plaza. A part of A1 motorway toll system.
	The southern terminus of the D220 dual carriageway expressway. Southbound D220 traffic continues to A1 motorway through Bisko interchange.
	Ž6260 to Bisko and Blato na Cetini.
	The northern terminus of the D220 dual carriageway expressway. Northbound D220 traffic continues along regular D220 two-lane state road.
	D60 south of Čaporice to Imotski (to the east). The southern tip of D60/D220 concurrency.
	Čaporice
	Trilj; D60 to Brnaze (to the west). The northern tip of D60/D220 concurrency. Ž6149 to Strmec Dolac and Ugljane.
	Ž6082 to Grab, Vrlika and Siverić.
	L67089 to Velić and Vrpolje.
	L67089 to Vrpolje and Strizirep.
	Ž6125 to Voštane.
	L67104 to Kamensko.
	Kamensko border crossing to Bosnia and Herzegovina towards Livno.

== See also ==
- Hrvatske autoceste
