= Josip Jović =

Croatian policeman (1969–1991)

- Jović during his military service in the Yugoslav People's Army c. 1988
- Born: 21 November 1969; Aržano, SR Croatia, SFR Yugoslavia
- Died: 31 March 1991 (aged 21); Plitvice, SR Croatia, SFR Yugoslavia
- Burial place: Aržano Cemetery
- Military career
- Allegiance: SFR Yugoslavia (1987–89); SR Croatia (1990–91)
- Rank: Policeman
- Unit: Croatian Special Police
- Conflicts: Croatian War of Independence; Plitvice Lakes incident †

Josip Jović (21 November 1969 – 31 March 1991) was a Croatian policeman who was killed during the Plitvice Lakes incident. He is widely considered the first Croatian fatality of the Croatian War of Independence.

== Biography ==
Jović was born on 21 November 1969 in the village of Aržano, near Imotski, to Filip and Marija Jović. He was raised with four siblings, brother Tomislav and sisters Franka, Mirna and Anita. After completing his compulsory military service in a JNA Mechanised Infantry unit in Montenegro between 1987 and 1989, on 5 August 1990, Jović joined the Croatian Ministry of the Interior (MUP) Unit for Special Purposes in Zagreb. On 29 March 1991, the Plitvice Lakes management was expelled by rebel Krajina Serb police under the control of Milan Martić, supported by paramilitary volunteers from Serbia proper under the command of Vojislav Šešelj. On Easter Sunday, 31 March 1991, Croatian police officers entered the national park to expel the Serb rebels. Serb paramilitaries ambushed a bus carrying Croatian police into the national park on the road north of Korenica, sparking a day-long gun battle between the two sides. Jović was struck by a burst of fire at the post-office building, penetrating his bulletproof vest. His colleague, Mladen Pavković, later described Jović's last moments before he was transferred to the ambulance. When a Yugoslav People's Army helicopter landed to transfer him to the hospital, Jović was already dead. He was buried with military honors at the cemetery in Aržano.

== Honours ==
Jović was posthumously promoted to the rank of major. He was awarded with the Order of Petar Zrinski and Fran Krsto Frankopan, Homeland War Memorial Medal, 1st Guards Brigade Memorial badge and Memorial Medal of the first killed Ministry of the Interior police officer during the Croatian War of Independence.

On 29 September 2011, the Croatian prime minister, Jadranka Kosor, opened the "Police Academy Josip Jović" in Jović's honour.
