= Žeževica =

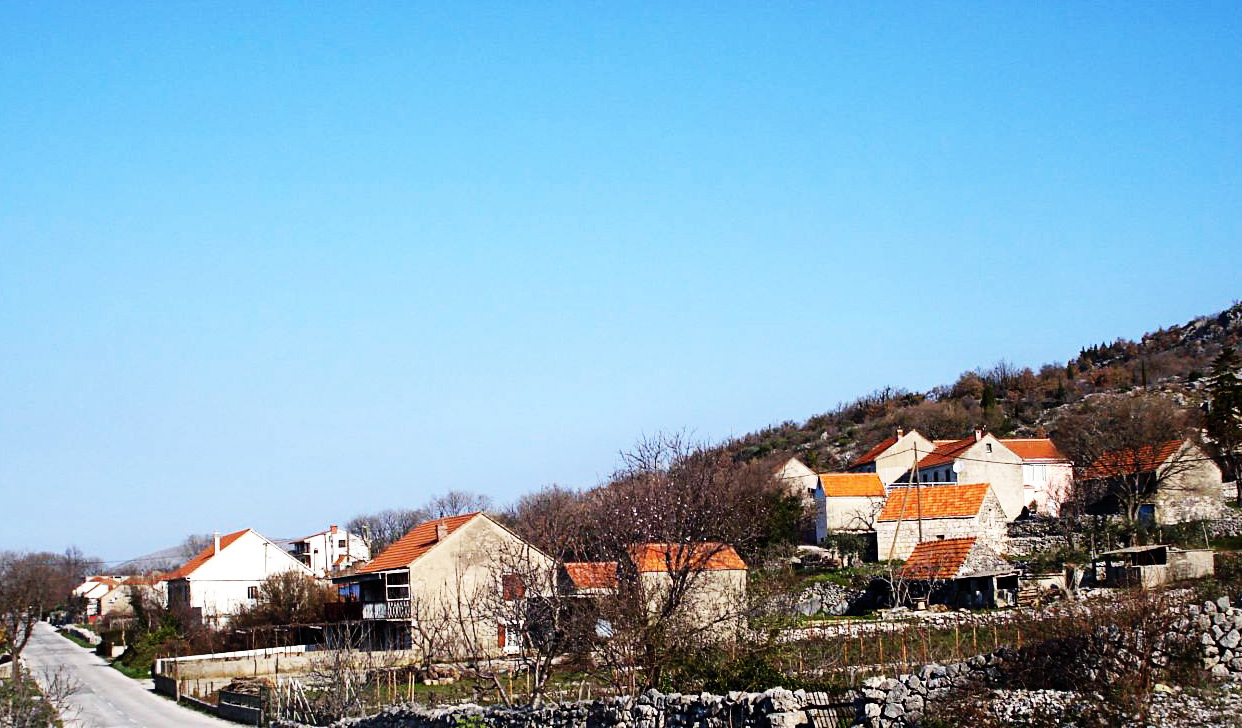

- Location within Croatia
- Coordinates: 43°27′N 16°58′E
- Country: Croatia
- County: Split-Dalmatia
- Municipality: Šestanovac

Area
  - Total: 24.0 km^{2} (9.3 sq mi)

Population (2021)
  - Total: 306
  - Density: 12.8/km^{2} (33.0/sq mi)
- Time zone: UTC+1 (CET)
  - Summer (DST): UTC+2 (CEST)

Žeževica is a village in central Dalmatia, Croatia with a population of 350 (2011). It is located in the municipality of Šestanovac, 15 km from the Adriatic Sea.

The community has a Mediterranean climate, and the streets are lined with stone houses and historic structures. The village's main landmark is the Church of St. George, built in 1776, which is located on a natural landmark, a hill named Orje.

Žeževica is situated at the base of the Biokovo mountain. A short distance from Žeževica are some of the biggest Croatian tourist centers: Brela, Baška Voda and Makarska. Nearby is a river, the Cetina, which is a popular destination for rafting.

The village is mostly Roman Catholic.

The village is divided into two parts: Upper and Lower Žeževica.

In November 2005, a construction project was begun to build the Šestanovac-Ploče subsection of the Split-Dubrovnik highway, passing through Lower Žeževica. By the end of 2008. highway is opened.
