= Dobranje, Split-Dalmatia County =

Dobranje
- Village
- Interactive map of Dobranje
- Location within Croatia
- Country: Croatia
- County: Split-Dalmatia County
- Municipality: Cista Provo

Area
  - Total: 17.1 km^{2} (6.6 sq mi)

Population (2021)
  - Total: 87
  - Density: 5.1/km^{2} (13/sq mi)
- Time zone: UTC+1 (CET)
  - Summer (DST): UTC+2 (CEST)
- Postal code: 21244
- Area code: 021
- Website: https://www.dobranje.hr/

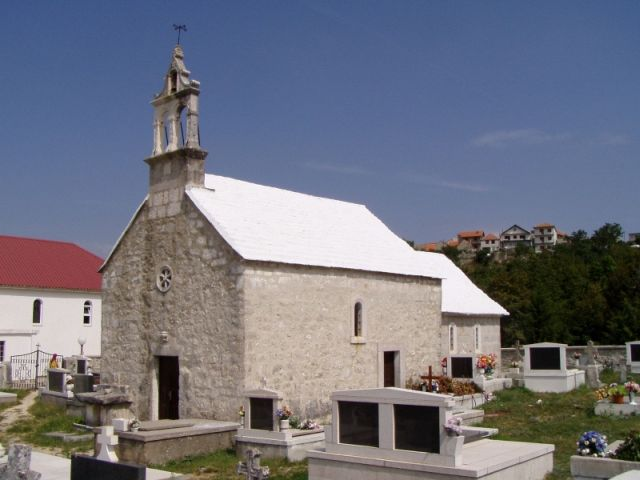
Church in Dobranje

Dobranje is a village in Cista Provo municipality, Croatia.

Dobranje is located to the north of Imotska Krajina. The village is 570 meters above sea level.

== History ==
The oldest document which mentions Dobranje is located in the archive of the Oriental Institute in Sarajevo and dates from 1585. Dobranje was probably populated before the Turkish invasion in the 15th century. When the Turks came, the local population fled to various places. Later they returned and some newcomers also arrived. Since Dobranje was on the border of the Ottoman Empire and the Venetian Republic there were many immigrants to the village. Major migrations happened when Turks expatriated Catholics from Herzegovina, especially in the time of the Morean War between Turks and Venetians (1684–1699) and the Austro-Turkish War (1716–1718).
