= Šestanovac, Bosnia and Herzegovina =

Šestanovac
- Village
- Location within Bosnia and Herzegovina
- Coordinates: 45.142043°N 15.958760°E
- Country: Bosnia and Herzegovina
- Entity: Federation of Bosnia and Herzegovina
- Canton: Una-Sana
- Municipality: Velika Kladuša

Area
  - Total: 2.93 sq mi (7.59 km^{2})

Population (2013)
  - Total: 341
  - Density: 116/sq mi (44.9/km^{2})
- Time zone: UTC+1 (CET)
  - Summer (DST): UTC+2 (CEST)

Šestanovac is a village in the municipality of Velika Kladuša, Bosnia and Herzegovina.

== Demographics ==
According to the 2013 census, its population was 341.

Ethnicity in 2013
Ethnicity	Number	Percentage
Bosniaks	315	92.4%
Croats	4	1.2%
other/undeclared	22	6.5%
Total	341	100%
