= Brnaze =

- Village
- Interactive map of Brnaze
- Location of Brnaze in Croatia
- Coordinates: 43°40′34″N 16°39′07″E
- Country: Croatia
- County: Split-Dalmatia County
- Municipality: Sinj

Area
  - Total: 21.9 km^{2} (8.5 sq mi)
- Elevation: 300 m (980 ft)

Population (2021)
  - Total: 3,124
  - Density: 143/km^{2} (369/sq mi)
- Time zone: UTC+1 (CET)
  - Summer (DST): UTC+2 (CEST)
- Postal code: 21230 Sinj
- Vehicle registration: ST

Brnaze is a village in Split-Dalmatia County in Croatia. It is located along the D1 highway. With a population of 3,124 in 2021, Brnaze is the third largest settlement in the town of Sinj.

== History ==
An early Croatian church of St. Michael was found in 1947-48 in the village of Brnaze at the Bunarska Glavica hill. The church with six apses was built in the 9th or 10th century, most likely on the foundations of a church from the early Christian, pre-Croatian period, in 5th or 6th century. The church was largely demolished in the 13th century. Fragments of church stone-furniture from the early Croatian period, part of an early Christian altar partition and several antique monuments were found scattered around. In and around the church tens of late medieval graves with offerings such as rings, earrings, spurs, and money were also found.

== Demographics ==
Settlement Brnaze: Population trends 1857–2021
v

| population | 718 | 905 | 787 | 950 | 1126 | 1199 | 1495 | 1722 | 1712 | 1846 | 2108 | 2536 | 3126 | 3097 | 3223 | 3184 | 3124 |
| | 1857 | 1869 | 1880 | 1890 | 1900 | 1910 | 1921 | 1931 | 1948 | 1953 | 1961 | 1971 | 1981 | 1991 | 2001 | 2011 | 2021 |

Note:Until 1890, it was reported under the name of Brnace. In 1991, the settlement of Brnaze was reduced by the part of the settlement that was annexed to the settlement of Sinj. In 1869, 1921 and 1931, it contains part of the data for the settlement of Sinj. Sources: Croatian Bureau of Statistics publications

== Notable people ==
- Ante Tomašević (1872–1918), athlete, champion of Austria-Hungary in wrestling
- Josip Šentija (1931–2020), journalist, publicist and lexicographer
- Marijan Mandac (1939–2023), Franciscan priest, theologian and translator
- Anđelko Vučković (1942–2007), five-time winner of Sinjska alka
