= Šestanovac, Croatia =

Municipality in Split-Dalmatia County, Croatia

Šestanovac
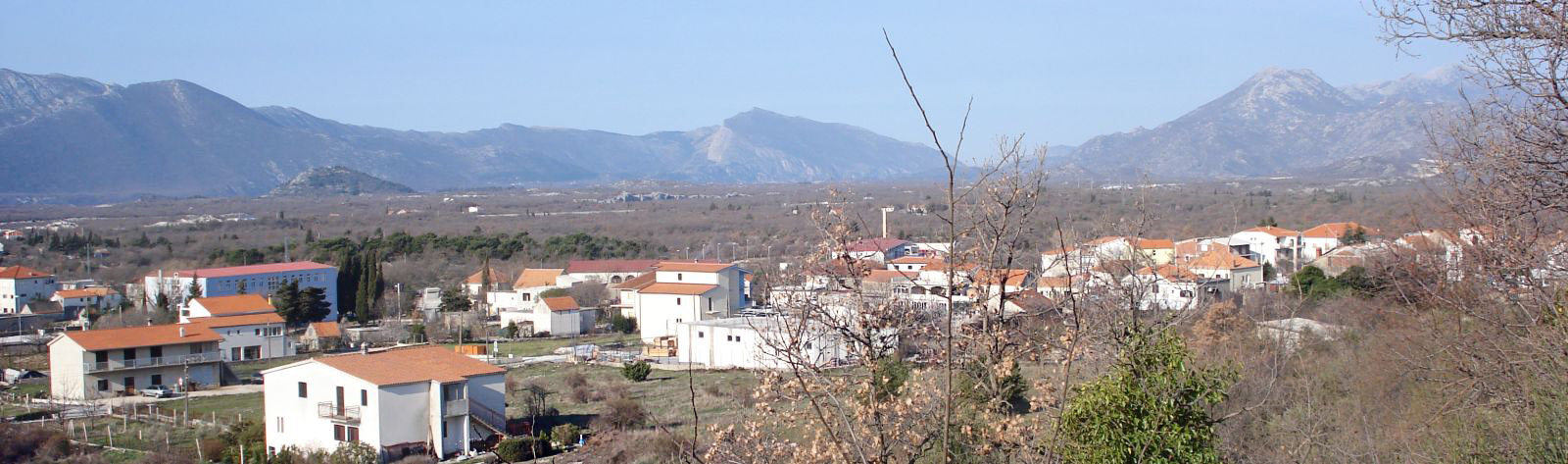
- Interactive map of Šestanovac
- Location within Croatia
- Coordinates: 43°27′0″N 16°54′36″E
- Country: Croatia
- Region: Dalmatian Hinterland
- County: Split-Dalmatia County

Area
  - Total: 89.8 km^{2} (34.7 sq mi)

Population (2021)
  - Total: 1,669
  - Density: 18.6/km^{2} (48.1/sq mi)
- Time zone: UTC+1 (CET)
  - Summer (DST): UTC+2 (CEST)
- Website: opcina-sestanovac.hr

Šestanovac is a municipality in Croatia in the Split-Dalmatia County.

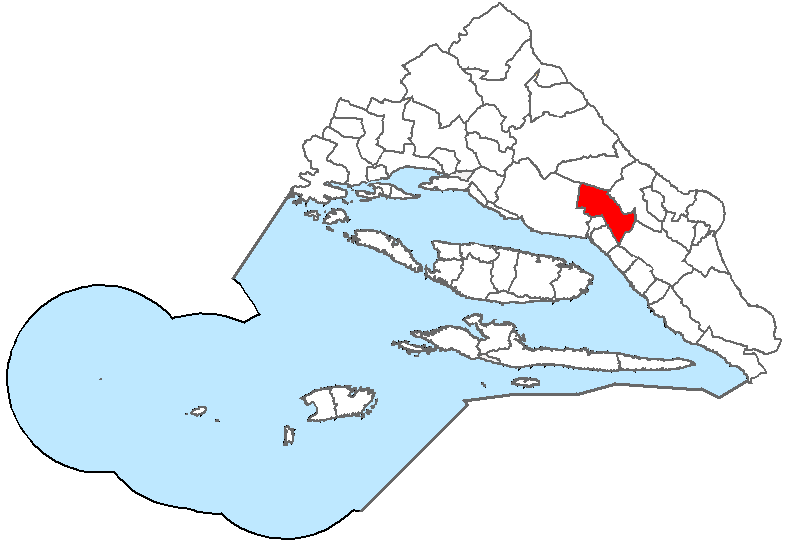
Šestanovac municipality area

== History ==
A 10 hectares (25 acres) fire erupted near Šestanovac on 17 March 2009 and was reported at 10:06, then put out by the DVD Zadvarje the DVD Gata, the DVD Kučići and the DVD Omiš with 25 firefighters and 4 vehicles, together with an Air Tractor plane, put out by 17:40.

== Climate ==
Since records began in 1981, the highest temperature recorded at the local weather station was 39.4 °C (102.9 °F), on 4 August 1981. The coldest temperature was −12.5 °C (9.5 °F), on 13 January 1985.

== Demographics ==
In the 2011 census, it had a total population of 2,685, in the following settlements:

- Grabovac, population 372
- Katuni, population 562
- Kreševo, population 248
- Šestanovac, population 426
- Žeževica, population 350

In the same census, 99.54% of the population were Croats.

Šestanovac: Population trends 1857–2021
v

| population | 2876 | 3702 | 3521 | 4338 | 4725 | 5199 | 5463 | 5327 | 5161 | 5345 | 4973 | 4833 | 3789 | 3318 | 2685 | 1958 | 1669 |
| | 1857 | 1869 | 1880 | 1890 | 1900 | 1910 | 1921 | 1931 | 1948 | 1953 | 1961 | 1971 | 1981 | 1991 | 2001 | 2011 | 2021 |

Sources: Croatian Bureau of Statistics publications
