= Cista Provo =

- Municipality
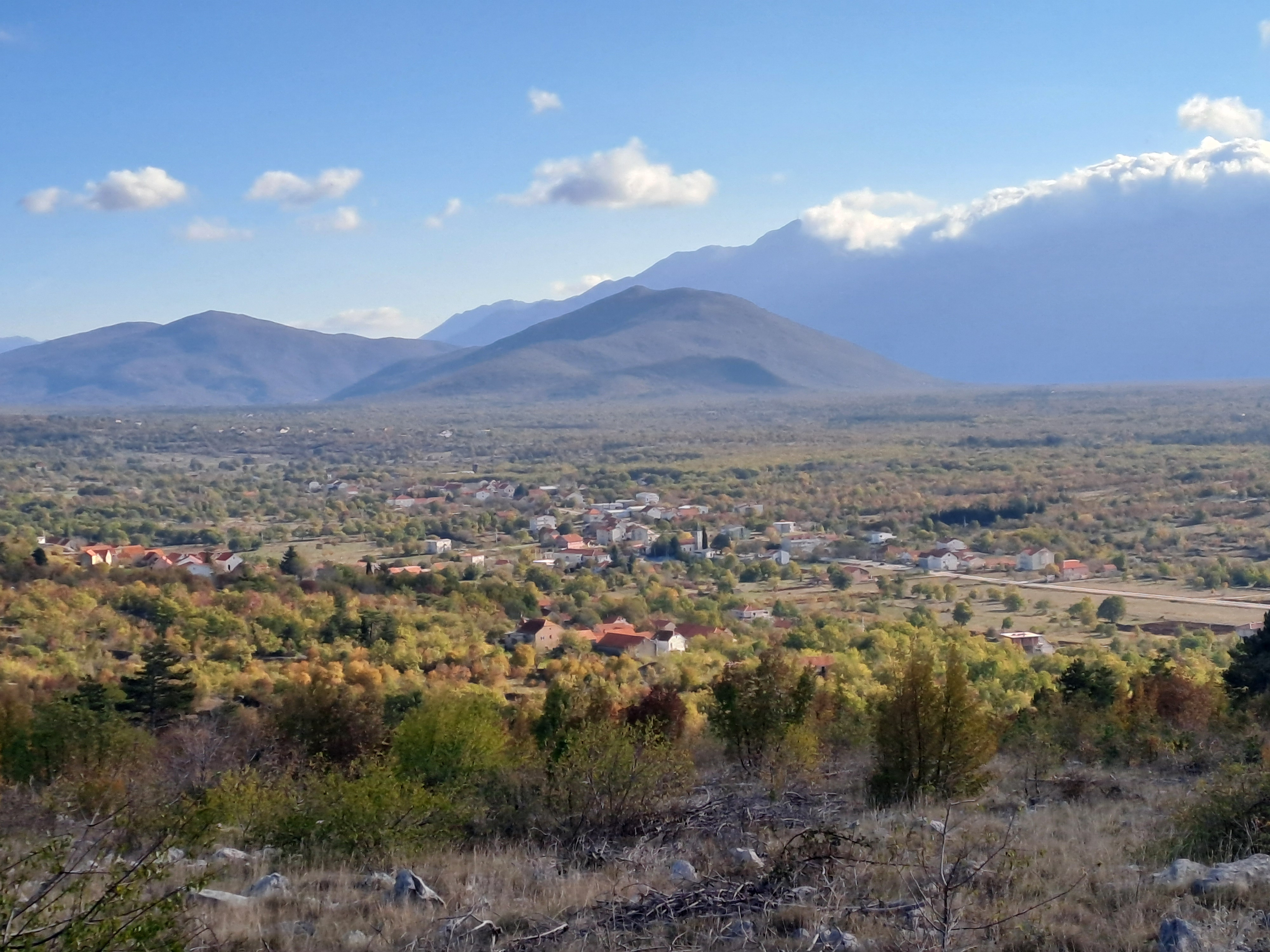

- Location within Croatia
- Coordinates: 43°30′N 16°57′E
- Country: Croatia
- Region: Dalmatian Hinterland
- County: Split-Dalmatia County

Government
  - Načelnik: Tomislav Šitum (Croatian Democratic Party)

Area
  - Municipality: 108.1 km^{2} (41.7 sq mi)
  - Urban: 9.9 km^{2} (3.8 sq mi)

Population (2021)
  - Municipality: 1,799
  - Density: 16.64/km^{2} (43.10/sq mi)
  - Urban: 404
  - Urban density: 41/km^{2} (110/sq mi)
- Time zone: UTC+1 (CET)
  - Summer (DST): UTC+2 (CEST)
- Website: opcina-cista-provo.hr

Cista Provo is a municipality in Croatia in the Split-Dalmatia County. It has a population of 2,335 (2011 census), in an area of 98 km^{2} (38 sq mi). Around Cista Provo, there are a few villages, including Olujići, Dumancici, and Kasumi.

== Notable people ==
- Ivo Rojnica, World War II Ustaše official.

== Population ==
In 2021, the municipality had 1,799 residents in the following 6 settlements:

- Aržano, population 392
- Biorine, population 152
- Cista Provo, population 404
- Cista Velika, population 441
- Dobranje, population 87
- Svib, population 323
Cista Provo: Population trends 1857–2021
v

population	3254	3539	3753	4250	4778	5540	5558	5830	6404	6363	6486	6615	5359	5105	3674	2335	1799
	1857	1869	1880	1890	1900	1910	1921	1931	1948	1953	1961	1971	1981	1991	2001	2011	2021

Sources: Croatian Bureau of Statistics publications
