= Brela =

Municipality in Split-Dalmatia County, Croatia

- Municipality
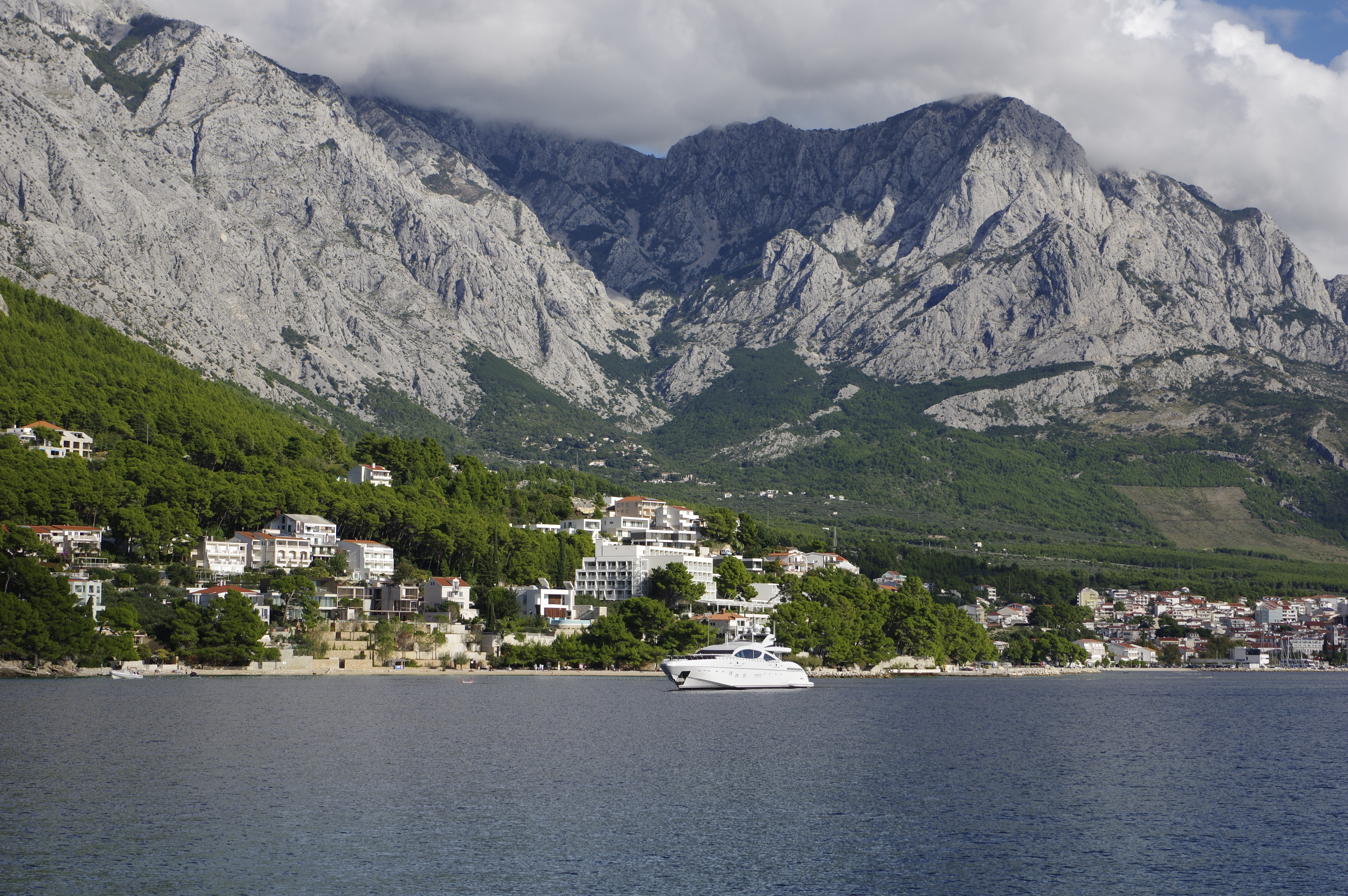
- Brela town underneath Biokovo

- Location of Brela within Croatia
- Coordinates: 43°22′11″N 16°55′21″E
- Country: Croatia
- Region: Dalmatia
- County: Split-Dalmatia County

Government
  - Mayor: Stipe Ursić (HDZ)

Area
  - Municipality: 26.8 km^{2} (10.3 sq mi)
  - Urban: 6.9 km^{2} (2.7 sq mi)

Population (2021)
  - Municipality: 1,626
  - Density: 60.7/km^{2} (157/sq mi)
  - Urban: 1,472
  - Urban density: 210/km^{2} (550/sq mi)
- Time zone: UTC+1 (CET)
  - Summer (DST): UTC+2 (CEST)
- Postal code: 21322 Brela
- Area code: +385 (0)21
- Patron saints: Saint Stephen; Our Lady of Mount Carmel
- Website: opcina-brela.hr

Brela (pronounced [brě̞la]) is a municipality in the Split-Dalmatia County of Croatia. The village of Brela is located on the Adriatic coastline of Dalmatia, about 15 kilometres (9.3 mi) northwest of Makarska. In 2021, the total population was 1,626. The municipality consists of two villages: Brela and Gornja Brela.

Brela is a tourist town located between the Biokovo mountain and the Adriatic Sea. It is known as the pearl of Makarska riviera. The pearl of the Adriatic or the pearl of Mediterranean is the name given to the city of Dubrovnik. In 1968, Brela was crowned as "Champion of Adriatic" for high achievements in tourist activity.

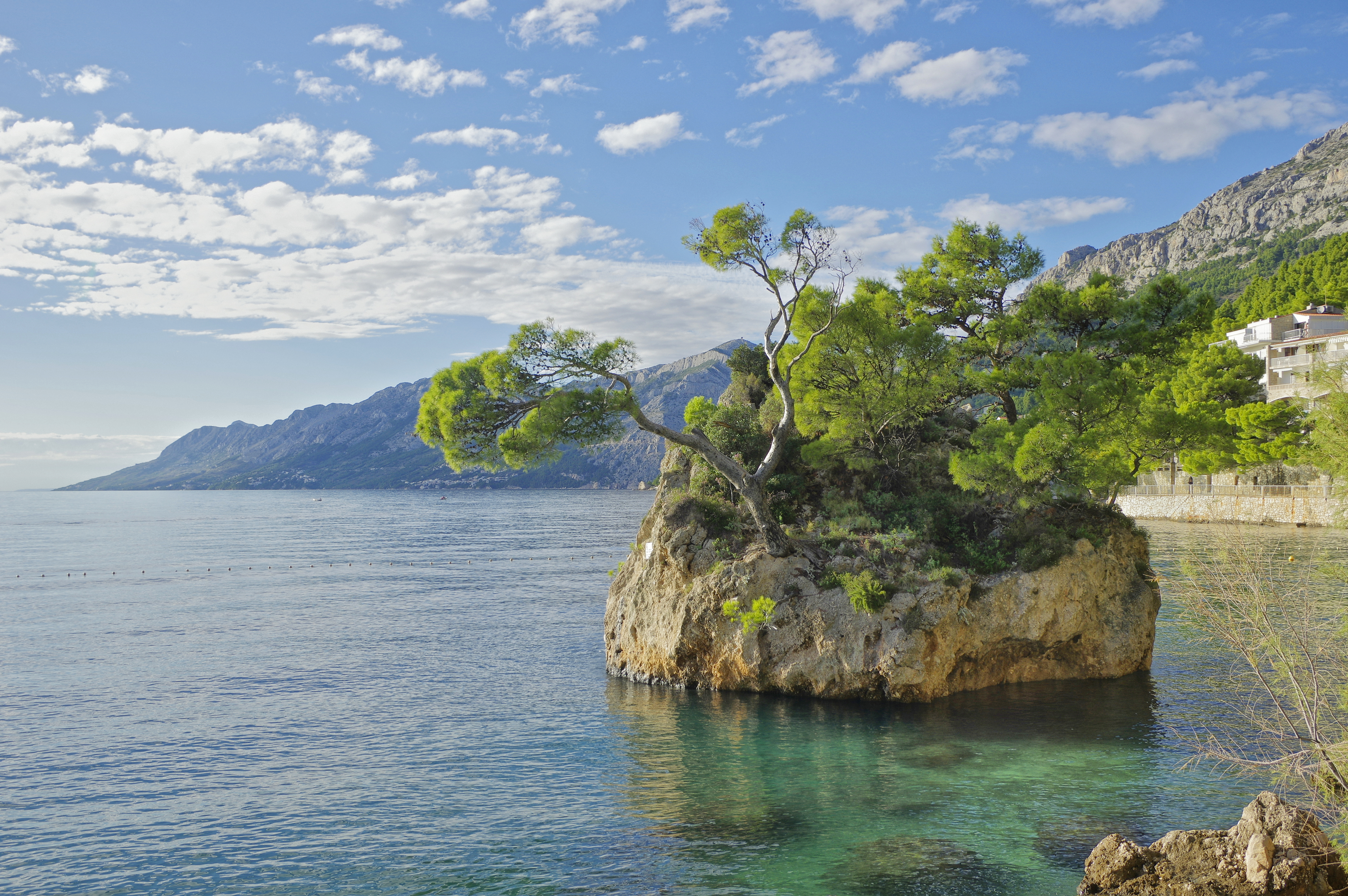
"Kamen Brela" and Punta Rata beach in Brela

The symbol of Brela is "Kamen Brela" (Brela Stone), a small rock island just off the main beach in Brela, the Punta Rata beach. In 2004, American magazine Forbes put the Punta Rata beach on the list of 10 world's most beautiful beaches, where it is ranked 6th in the world and first in Europe. In January 2024, Lonely Planet ranked Punta Rata as the 11th best beach in the world, calling it "one of the Croatian coast’s most exquisite beaches."

== Demographics ==
In 2021, the municipality had 1626 residents in the following 2 settlements:

- Brela, population 1472
- Gornja Brela, population 154
Brela: Population trends 1857–2021
v

population	707	755	789	991	1144	1342	1342	1446	1590	1696	1697	1688	1614	1684	1771	1703	1626
	1857	1869	1880	1890	1900	1910	1921	1931	1948	1953	1961	1971	1981	1991	2001	2011	2021

Sources: Croatian Bureau of Statistics publications
