= Aržano =

- Location within Croatia
- Coordinates: 43.58°N 17.0°E
- Country: Croatia
- County: Split-Dalmatia
- Municipality: Cista Provo

Area
  - Total: 15.9 km^{2} (6.1 sq mi)

Population (2021)
  - Total: 392
  - Density: 24.7/km^{2} (63.9/sq mi)
- Time zone: UTC+1 (CET)
  - Summer (DST): UTC+2 (CEST)

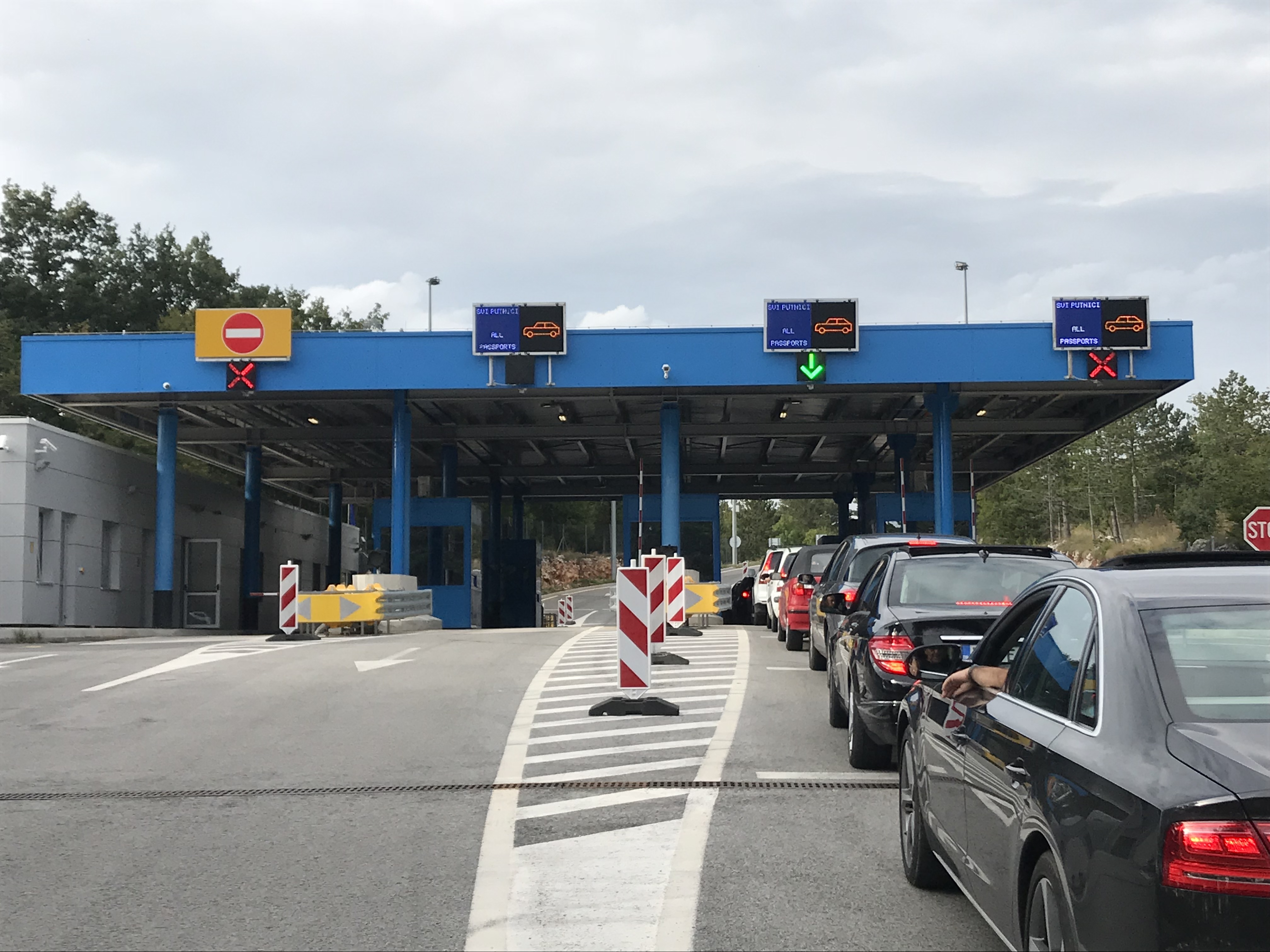
Aržano border crossing Croatia-Bosnia

Aržano is a small village in the Zagora, region of Croatia, situated near the border with Bosnia and Herzegovina at an altitude of 650 m. According to the 2011 census, the village population is 478.

The village hosts the annual "Josip Jović Memorial Tournament," a 6-a-side soccer tournament honouring the death of local Josip Jović, the first casualty of the 1991-1995 Croatian War of Independence.
