= D62 road =

Road in Croatia

D62 state road

Route information
- Length: 89.5 km (55.6 mi)

Major junctions
- From: D39 in Šestanovac

- D76 near Zagvozd; A1 in Ravča interchange D512 in Ravča D425 near Mali Prolog

- To: D9 in Metković

Location
- Country: Croatia
- Counties: Split-Dalmatia, Dubrovnik-Neretva
- Major cities: Zagvozd, Vrgorac, Metković

Highway system
- Highways in Croatia

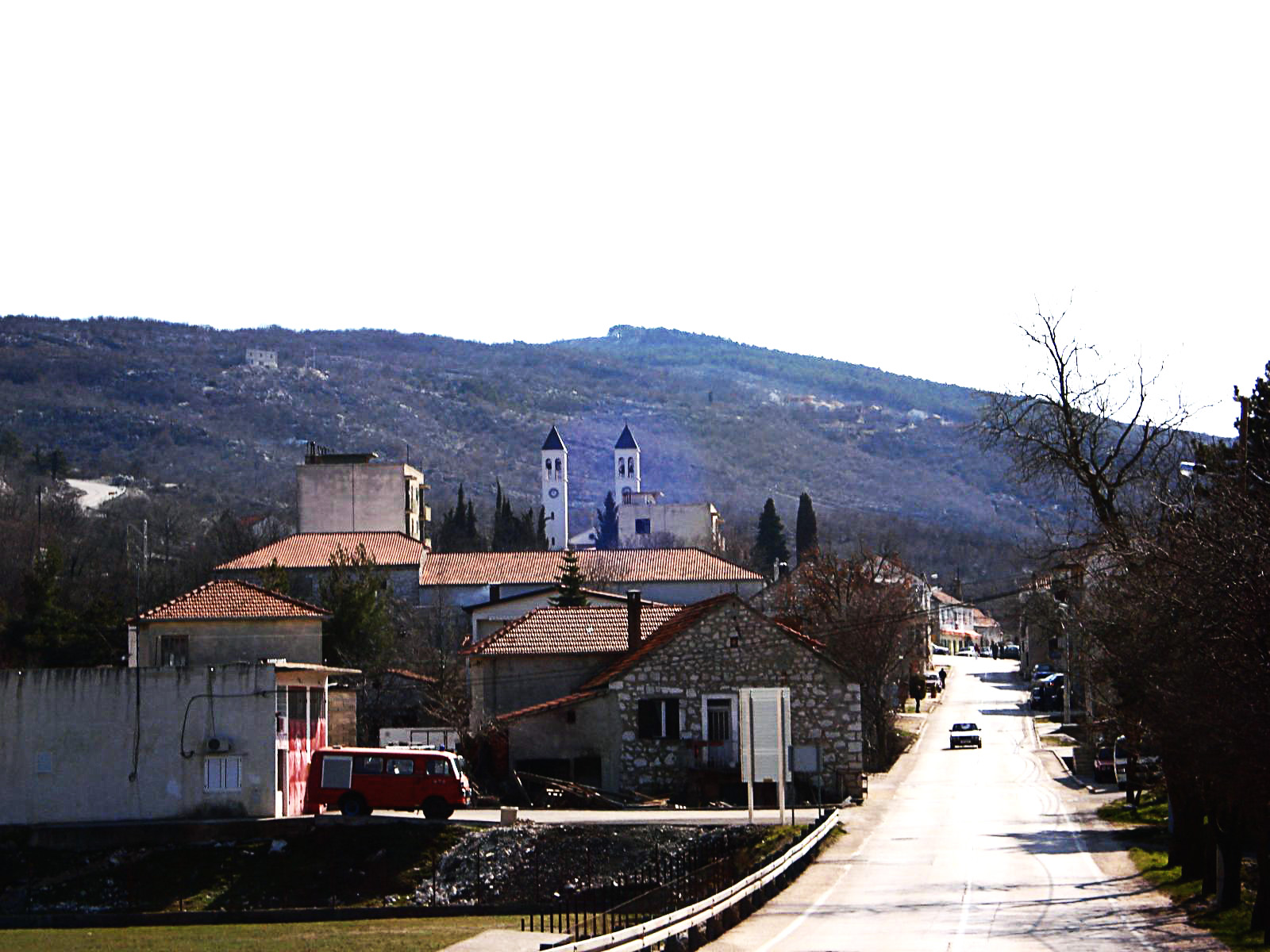
Zagvozd, on the D62 route

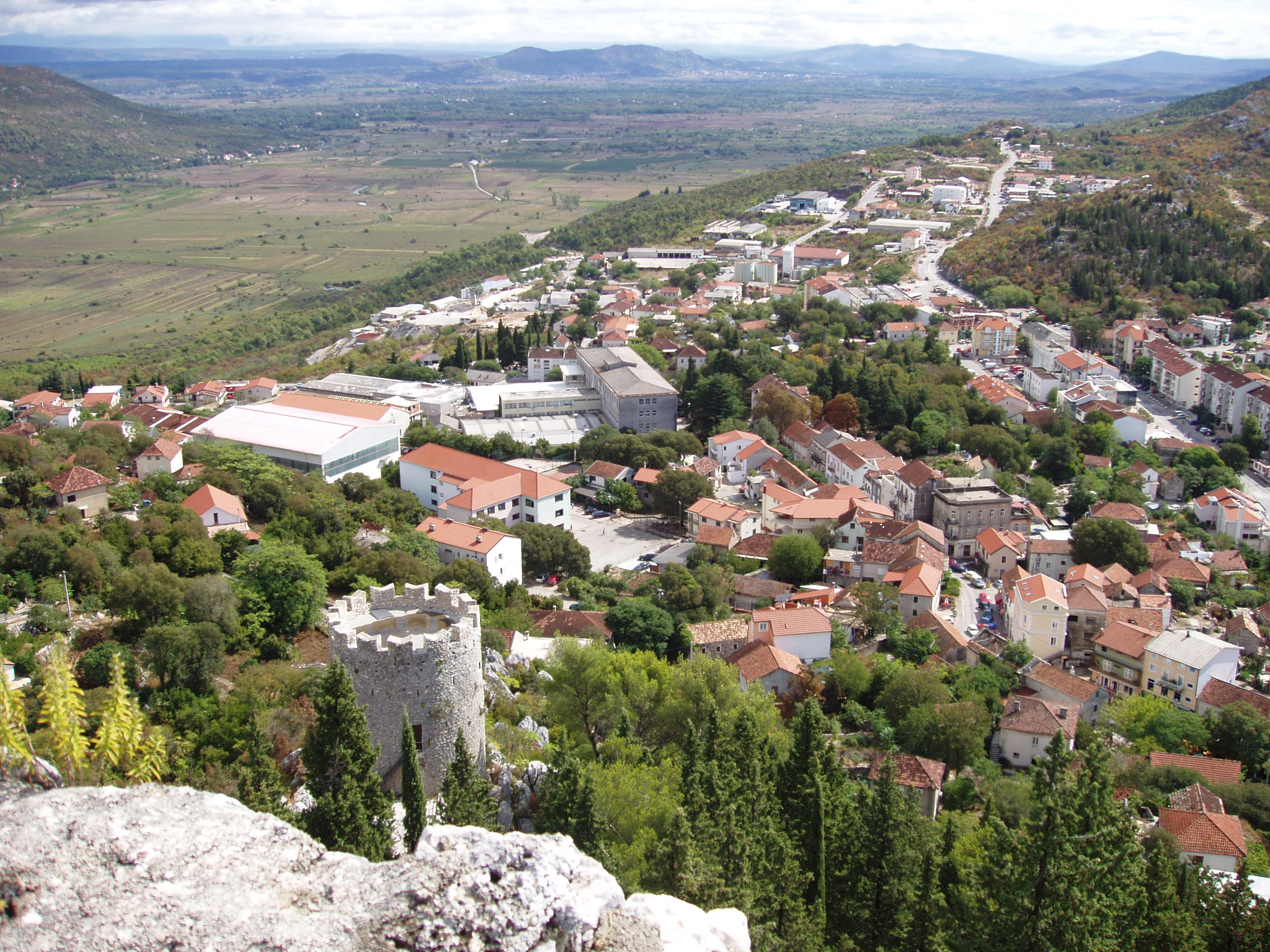
Vrgorac, on the D62 route

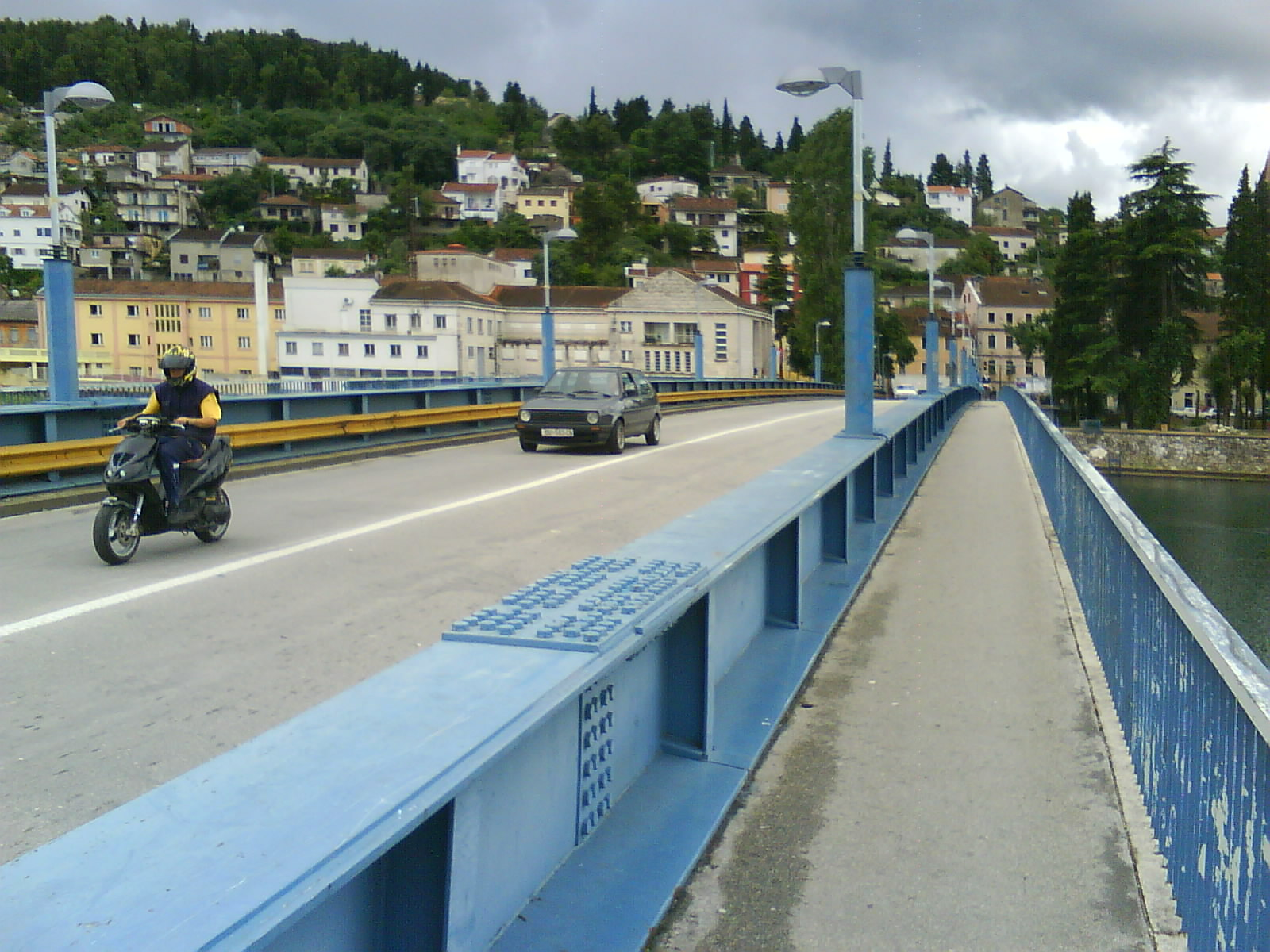
Port Bridge, Metković, just to the north of the southern terminus of D62

D62 is a state road running parallel to a section of A1 motorway route in Croatia, between Šestanovac, Vrgorac and Mali Prolog, and parallel to the A10 motorway after Mali Prolog. The road provides access to the Mali Prolog border crossing to Bosnia and Herzegovina via the D222 state road.

The road generally serves as a connecting road to the A1 motorway as it is connected to Šestanovac, Zagvozd, Blato na Cetini, Ravča, Vrgorac and Ploče interchanges via short connector roads or other state or county roads. The road is 89.5 km (55.6 mi) long.

The road, as well as all other state roads in Croatia, is managed and maintained by Hrvatske ceste, a state-owned company.

== Traffic volume ==
Traffic is regularly counted and reported by Hrvatske ceste, operator of the road. Substantial variations between annual (AADT) and summer (ASDT) traffic volumes are attributed to the fact that the road serves as a connection to A1 motorway carrying substantial tourist traffic to D512 and D425 state roads.

D62 traffic volume
Road	Counting site	AADT	ASDT	Notes
D62	6014 Zagvozd	2,509	-	Adjacent to the Ž6179 junction. Estimate by HC.
D62	6002 Ravča west	1,467	1,613	Adjacent to the D512 junction (to the north).
D62	6013 Vrgorac west	3,173	4,382	Between the D512 and Ž6208 junctions.
D62	6101 Nova Sela	726	628	Adjacent to the (former) D513 junction (to the south).

== Road junctions and populated areas ==
D62 junctions/populated areas
Type	Slip roads/Notes
	Šestanovac D39 to Brela and A1 motorway Šestanovac interchange (to the south) and Aržano border crossing to Livno, Bosnia and Herzegovina (to the north). Ž6260 to Blato na Cetini and Dugopolje. Northbound D62 traffic defaults to northbound Ž6260. The northern terminus of the road.
	Grabovac
	Ž6179 to Rastovac
	D76 to A1 motorway Zagvozd interchange and Baška Voda via Sveti Ilija Tunnel.
	Zagvozd; Ž6180 to Poljica and Grubine.
	Župa
	Ž6199 to Kozica and Šošići.
	A1 in Ravča interchange reached via a short connector road. Connection to Split (to the north).
	Ravča D512 to Makarska.
	Vrgorac; Ž6201 to Prapatnice and Stilja. Ž6208 to A1 motorway in Vrgorac interchange and Staševica.
	Veliki Prolog; Ž6210 to Podprolog.
	D222 to Mali Prolog border crossing to Bosnia and Herzegovina.
	D425 to Ploče.
	Mali Prolog
	Pojezerje
	A10 to the Ploče interchange (west) and the Metković border crossing (east).
	Nova Sela
	Podrujnica
	Momići
	Matijevići
	Kula Norinska Ž6217 to Krvavac, Komin and Rogotin.
	Metković; Ž6218 to Prud D9 to Opuzen. The southern terminus of the road.
