= D62 =

D62 may refer to:

- D62 steam locomotive
- HMS Khedive (D62), a 1942 British Royal Navy escort aircraft carrier
- HMS Jutland (D62), a 1946 British Royal Navy Battle-class fleet destroyer
- HMS Wild Swan (D62), a 1919 British Royal Navy V and W class of destroyer
- INS Mumbai, a 1995 Indian Navy Delhi-class destroyer
- D62 road (Croatia), a state road

and also:

- D 62, Nad Al Hammar Road, a road in Al Rashidiya, Dubai Emirate, United Arab Emirates
- the ICD-10 code for an acute posthaemorrhagic anaemia
