= D9 road (Croatia) =

Road in Croatia

D9 state road

Route information
- Part of
- Length: 10.9 km (6.8 mi)

Major junctions
- From: Metković border crossing to Bosnia and Herzegovina
- D62 in Metković
- To: D8 near Opuzen

Location
- Country: Croatia
- Counties: Dubrovnik-Neretva
- Major cities: Metković, Opuzen

Highway system
- Highways in Croatia

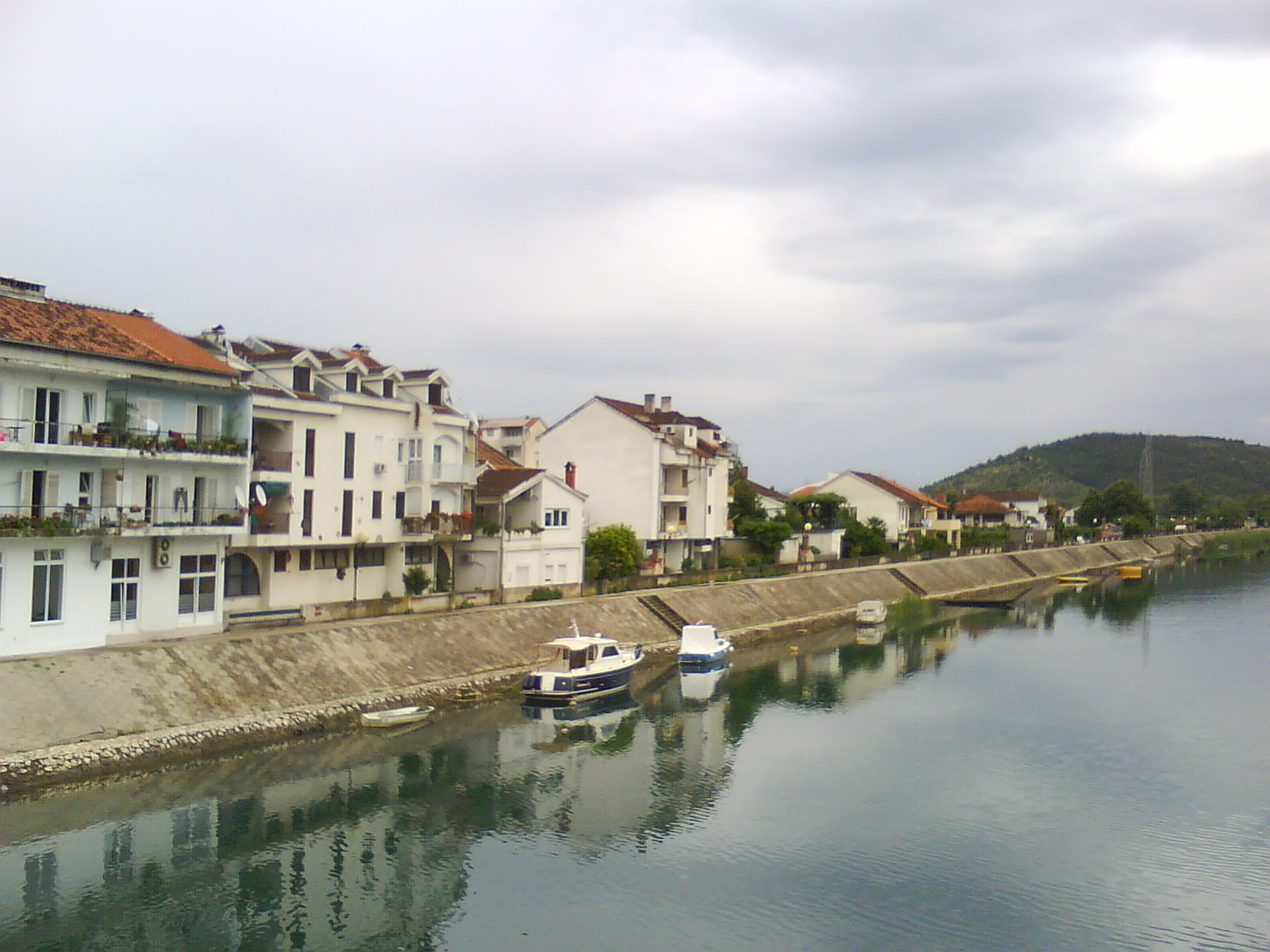
Metković, on the D9 route

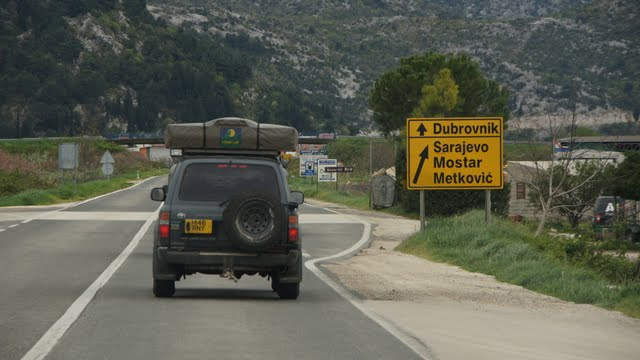
The southernmost segment of the D9 route switches to the D8 road

D9 is a state road connecting Metković border crossing to Čapljina and Mostar, Bosnia and Herzegovina and D8 state road south of Opuzen. The road is 10.9 km (6.8 mi) long.

The road also provides connection to A1 motorway Ploče interchange and A10 motorway Kula Norinska interchange via the D62 state road and cities of Metković and Opuzen.

The road, as well as all other state roads in Croatia, is managed and maintained by Hrvatske ceste, a state-owned company.

== Traffic volume ==
Traffic is regularly counted and reported by Hrvatske ceste, operator of the road. Substantial variations between annual (AADT) and summer (ASDT) traffic volumes are attributed to the fact that the road carries substantial tourist traffic.

D9 traffic volume
Road	Counting site	AADT	ASDT	Notes
D9	6103 Metković	4,974	6,578	Between the border crossing and D62 junction.
D9	6104 Kula Norinska	9,192	13,498	Adjacent to the L69012 junction.

== Road junctions and populated areas ==
D9 junctions/populated areas
Type	Slip roads/Notes
	Metković border crossing to Čapljina, Bosnia and Herzegovina.
	Metković; D62 to Vrgorac and A1 motorway Ploče interchange. Ž6220 to Mlinište.
	Opuzen; Ž6219 to Podgradina.
	D8 to Ploče (to the north) and Klek and Dubrovnik (to the south).

== See also ==
- Highways in Croatia
