= Zavojane =

- Village
- Location within Croatia
- Coordinates: 43.245852°N 17.255559°E
- Country: Croatia
- Historical region: Dalmatian Hinterland
- County: Split-Dalmatia
- Town: Vrgorac

Area
  - Total: 27.1 km^{2} (10.5 sq mi)
- Elevation: 400 m (1,300 ft)

Population (2021)
  - Total: 189
  - Density: 6.97/km^{2} (18.1/sq mi)
- Time zone: UTC+1 (CET)
  - Summer (DST): UTC+2 (CEST)
- Postal Code: 21276
- Area code: 021
- Licence plate: MA
- Climate: Cfa

Zavojane is a small village in the Split-Dalmatia County of Croatia. It is in the jurisdiction of Vrgorac, 100 km (62 mi) southeast of Split. It lies just below Sveti Mihovil mountain, which is 1,247 m (4,091 ft) high.

== History ==
Zavojane was first mentioned in documents of the Kreševskoj era in 1434.

=== Ottoman Empire ===
When Vrgorac capitulated to the Ottoman Empire, Zavojane probably fell with the rest of the area. The spread of Islam into the region that came with the arrival of the Ottoman army concerned the occupants of the monastery in Makarska, who began to worry about the residents in Zavojane and the surrounding region, fearing that many would convert to Islam.

=== Post-Ottoman occupation ===
After the liberation of inner Dalmatia from the Ottoman Empire, most of Kozica and the surrounding villages had been deserted because of the exodus of the populace to the northern regions of Croatia. The Venetian Republic repopulated the area with Herzegovinian people from the east.

The withdrawal of the Ottomans saw the region come under the jurisdiction of the Venetian Republic, then under the rule of Napoleon. A short and prosperous period followed, which included the construction of the "napoleonska cesta" (Napoleon's road), encouraging travel to the area. With the failure of Napoleon's campaign in Dalmatia, Zavojane fell under the rule of Austria-Hungary, and remained so until the end of the First World War.

=== The Parish of the Nativity of the Blessed Virgin Mary ===
The parish was first mentioned in the Kreševo Charter in 1434, and was founded in 1696, when the Franciscans from Živogošće brought the people from Broćno, below Mostar, to that region, which had been relaxed during the Cretan War.
The villages of

- Dragljane,
- Dubrava,
- Duga Njiva,
- Vlaka and
- Zavojane

belong to the parish.

The Church of the Nativity of the Blessed Virgin Mary in Zavojane was built at the beginning of the 18th century in the Baroque style. The church is a monumental, single-nave building with a rectangular apse, oriented east–west. It was built from uneven stones arranged in rows, measuring 25 meters in length and 10 meters in width. On the main western facade, there is a simple double-winged door with stone thresholds above the lintel of which an antique spolia with a depiction of a bird is installed. Also, there is carved 1712 – which is most likely the year of the church consecration. There is a stone rosette in the middle of the facade, and the facade ends with a simple gable, at the top of which sits a stone cross.
A smaller building with massive side walls was added on the south side of the church. On this side of the church is an entrance of simple design. To the right of the entrance, in a shallow relief, with a primitive appearance, a waist-length figure of Jesus Christ is shown.
On the opposite north side of the building, there is a baroque belfry, with a square floor plan with stylistic abnormalities visible on the first two floors, while the final third floor is built in the form of a baroque loggia with biforas on all four sides.
The bell tower has a separate entrance, with a simple design above the lintel of which the year of construction is engraved: A. D. 1795. It stands at 30 meters high. There are three bells on the bell tower: two from 1800 and one from 1695 as well as a public clock.

The interior of the church consists of a nave area and a smaller sanctuary raised by one step. The triumphal arch separates the nave from the sanctuary. It was vaulted with a barrel vault and then the entire interior was painted. In the church, there are three eclectic wooden altars from the 19th century, made in the Rako workshop from Imotski, which is unknown to the general public. On the main altar, located in the apse of the church, there is a painting by Ivan Skvarčina The Virgin and Child (1847). On the north side altar is the painting The Coronation of the Blessed Virgin Mary by Filippo Naldi, and on the south side altar is the painting Saint George Killing the Dragon by the same artist. The floor of the church is covered with ceramic tiles. In 1926, the church was painted by Frano Ferenc from Trpanj on Pelješac. There are three statues in the church: the Heart of Jesus, the Virgin Mary and St. Anthony of Padua.
Around the church, a cemetery is surrounded by a wall, on the eastern side of which there is an entrance with a semicircular arch.
The parish belongs to the Biokovo deanery of the Archdiocese of Split-Makarska and is pastorally served by the Franciscans of the Province of the Holy Redeemer whose headquarters are in Split.
250 parishioners live in the parish (data from 2023).
The oldest information about the pastor dates back to 1683.
The Church of the Nativity of the Blessed Virgin Mary in Zavojane is the most monumental baroque building in the Vrgorac region, with the highest quality construction work of local masters from the 18th century. It is an immovable cultural asset of the Republic of Croatia.

== Climate ==
Zavojane has a Sub-Mediterranean climate, but due to its elevation Zavojane has its own microclimate which differs from the Dalmatian Coast. Zavojane is situated on a plateau in between two mountains, Biokovo and Sveti Mihovil.

== Tourism and the economy ==
Tourism has started in Zavojane and it is becoming common for cyclists and mountaineers to visit the area.

Zavojane is a small Mediterranean mountain village which is roughly 40 minutes by car from the nearest beach.Tourism in Zavojane is expected to increase when the Drvenik tunnel, which will connect Ravča to the ferry port of Drvenik will be built.

The nearest motorway exit for Zavojane is Ravča which is 1–2 km (0.62–1.24 mi) south of Kozica.

== Demographics ==
Population trends 1857–2021
v

population	831	976	942	1071	1202	1263	1201	1185	1022	1117	1030	907	645	508	392	308	189
	1857	1869	1880	1890	1900	1910	1921	1931	1948	1953	1961	1971	1981	1991	2001	2011	2021

Note:Includes Mijaca in 1869. Sources: Publikacije Državnog zavoda za statistiku Republike Hrvatske
