= Vinka Lucas =

New Zealand fashion designer (1932–2020)

Vinka Lucas MNZM
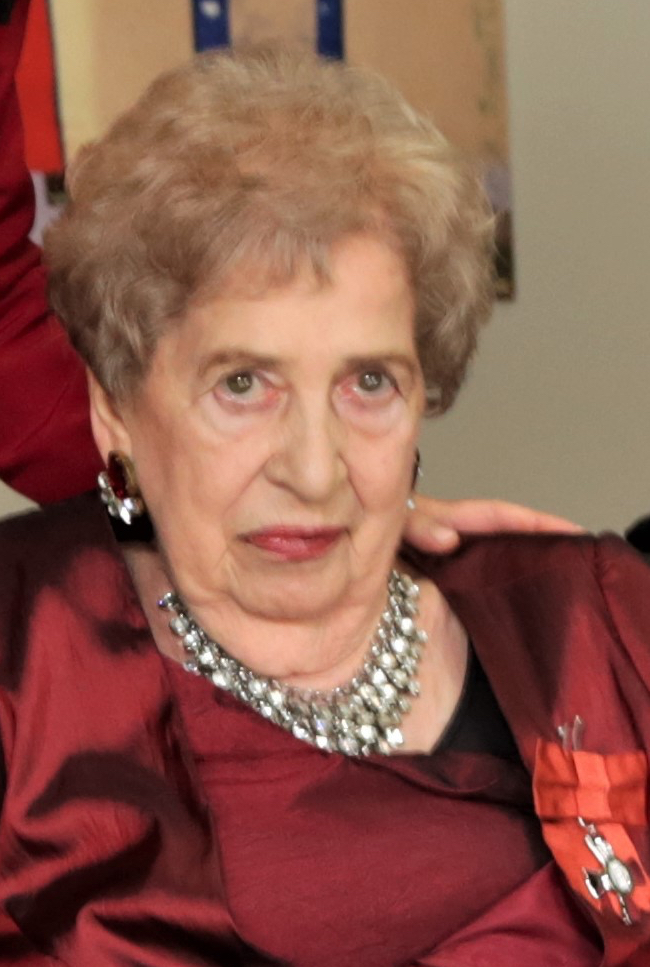
- Lucas in 2019
- Born: Vinka Dragica Ravlić; 1 January 1932; Kozica, Kingdom of Yugoslavia
- Died: 10 August 2020 (aged 88); Auckland, New Zealand
- Occupations: Fashion designer and retailer
- Years active: 1959–2009
- Known for: Co-founder of New Zealand Bride magazine

Vinka Dragica Lucas MNZM (née Ravlich / Ravlić; 1 January 1932 – 10 August 2020) was a New Zealand fashion and bridalwear designer, business owner and co-founder of New Zealand Bride magazine.

== Early life ==
Lucas was born in Croatia, in the village of Kozica near the Adriatic coast. While growing up there, she learned the traditional local skills of needlework and embroidery, and later moved to Zagreb to learn cutting and design at the Academy of Dress & Design.

In 1951 Lucas moved to New Zealand to live with her sister in Northland. Despite having limited English, she worked in her sister's general store in the small town of Maungatapere. In 1955 she moved to Auckland and started working in the fabric department of department store Price & Dempster. She became a naturalised New Zealand citizen in 1959.

== Career ==
In 1959 Lucas and her husband David Lucas bought a fashion and dressmaking business in Hamilton; they renamed it Maree de Maru (meaning "Marriage of the Brides" in Croatian) and turned it into a bridalwear store. In 1962 the couple opened a store in Customs Street, Auckland, and in 1966 moved it to the city's busiest street, Queen Street.

Over the next few years, Lucas opened four more fashion stores on Queen Street: Modern Bride, which sold a simpler range of bridalwear than Maree de Maru; Buttons Galore, for trimmings and accessories; Stanton Silks, which sold exclusively imported fabrics; and Vinka Lucas After 5, for cocktail and evening wear.

In 1963, the couple published a booklet of bridal designs, which later grew into the magazine New Zealand Bride. David Lucas was managing editor and art director, while Vinka Lucas organised shoots and was fashion director. Lucas designed blue-green ensembles for Air New Zealand staff uniforms in 1973.

In the 1980s, Lucas branched out into the Middle Eastern market; in partnership with a local sheikh, Sheikh Abbas Filamban, she opened a salon, the Vinka Lucas Designer Collections Salon, in Jeddah, Saudi Arabia and another in Kuwait. In the same decade, Lucas won two major achievements: showing a collection at the London Fashion Olympics in 1980; and winning the international fashion competition run by the Association of Voralberger Embroiderers of Austria.

== Later life, death and legacy ==
In 2009, Lucas suffered a stroke and retired; her daughter Anita Turner-Williams took over and continued running the business, under the names Vinka Design and Vinka Brides.

In 2017, a Vinka Lucas-designed dress was discovered in a bag of clothes donated to a hospice charity shop in Auckland. The shop gave the dress to the Auckland Museum, which placed it on display. A number of Lucas' sewing patterns are in the collection of Museum of New Zealand Te Papa Tongarewa.

Dresses by Lucas are part of the Eden Hore fashion collection.

In the 2019 New Year Honours, Lucas was appointed a Member of the New Zealand Order of Merit, for services to the fashion industry and design. She died in Auckland on 10 August 2020, aged 88 years; her funeral notice advised mourners, "Vinka's standard of dress mandatory".
