= D512 road =

Road in Croatia

D512 state road

Route information
- Length: 30.6 km (19.0 mi)

Major junctions
- From: D8 in Makarska
- To: D62 in Ravča

Location
- Country: Croatia
- Counties: Split-Dalmatia
- Major cities: Makarska

Highway system
- Highways in Croatia

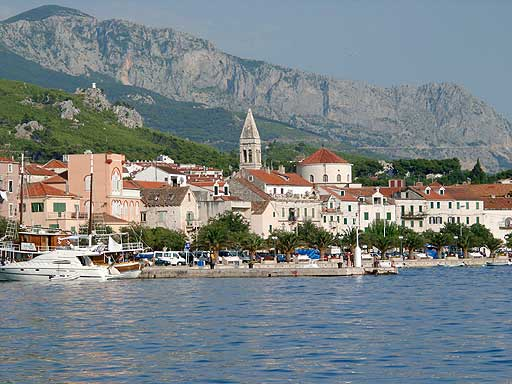
Makarska, at the southern terminus of D512

D512 is a state road connecting Makarska and Ravča on D62 state road, near the A1 motorway Ravča interchange in Crisis.

The road is a connecting road to the A1 motorway for Makarska, Tučepi, Podgora and Drvenik. The road is 30.6 km (19.0 mi) long.

Like all state roads in Croatia, the D512 is managed and maintained by Hrvatske ceste, a state-owned company.

== Traffic volume ==
Traffic is regularly counted and reported by Hrvatske ceste, the operator of the road. Substantial variations between annual (AADT) and summer (ASDT) traffic volumes are attributed to the fact that the road serves as a connection to the A1 motorway and the D8 state road carrying substantial tourist traffic.

D512 traffic volume
Road	Counting site	AADT	ASDT	Notes
D512	6003 Ravča south	1,541	2,712	Adjacent to the D62 junction.

== Road junctions and populated areas ==
D512 junctions/populated areas
Type	Slip roads/Notes
	Makarska; D8 to Baška Voda and Makarska ferry port, providing access to Sumartin, Brač (to the north) and Tučepi and Drvenik (to the south). The southern terminus of the road.
	Ž6198 to Podgora
	Ž6199 to Šošići and Kozica.
	Gornje Igrane
	Duge Njive
	Kljenak
	Ravča; D62 to Zagvozd (to the north) and Vrgorac (to the south).
