= D222 road =

Road in Croatia

D222 state road

Route information
- Length: 0.6 km (0.37 mi; 2,000 ft)

Major junctions
- From: Mali Prolog border crossing to Bosnia and Herzegovina
- To: D62 near Mali Prolog

Location
- Country: Croatia
- Counties: Dubrovnik-Neretva

Highway system
- Highways in Croatia

D222 is a state road in Dalmatia region of Croatia branching off north from the D62 to Mali Prolog border crossing to Bosnia and Herzegovina. The road is 0.6 km (0.37 mi) long.

The road, as well as all other state roads in Croatia, is managed and maintained by Hrvatske ceste, a state-owned company.

== Road junctions and populated areas ==
D222 junctions/populated areas
Type	Slip roads/Notes
	Mali Prolog border crossing to Bosnia and Herzegovina. The eastern terminus of the road. The northern terminus of the road.
	D62 near Mali Prolog to A1 motorway Ploče interchange and Vrgorac (to the west) and to Metković (to the east). The southern terminus of the road.
