= Kobiljača, Dubrovnik-Neretva County =

Kobiljača
- Village
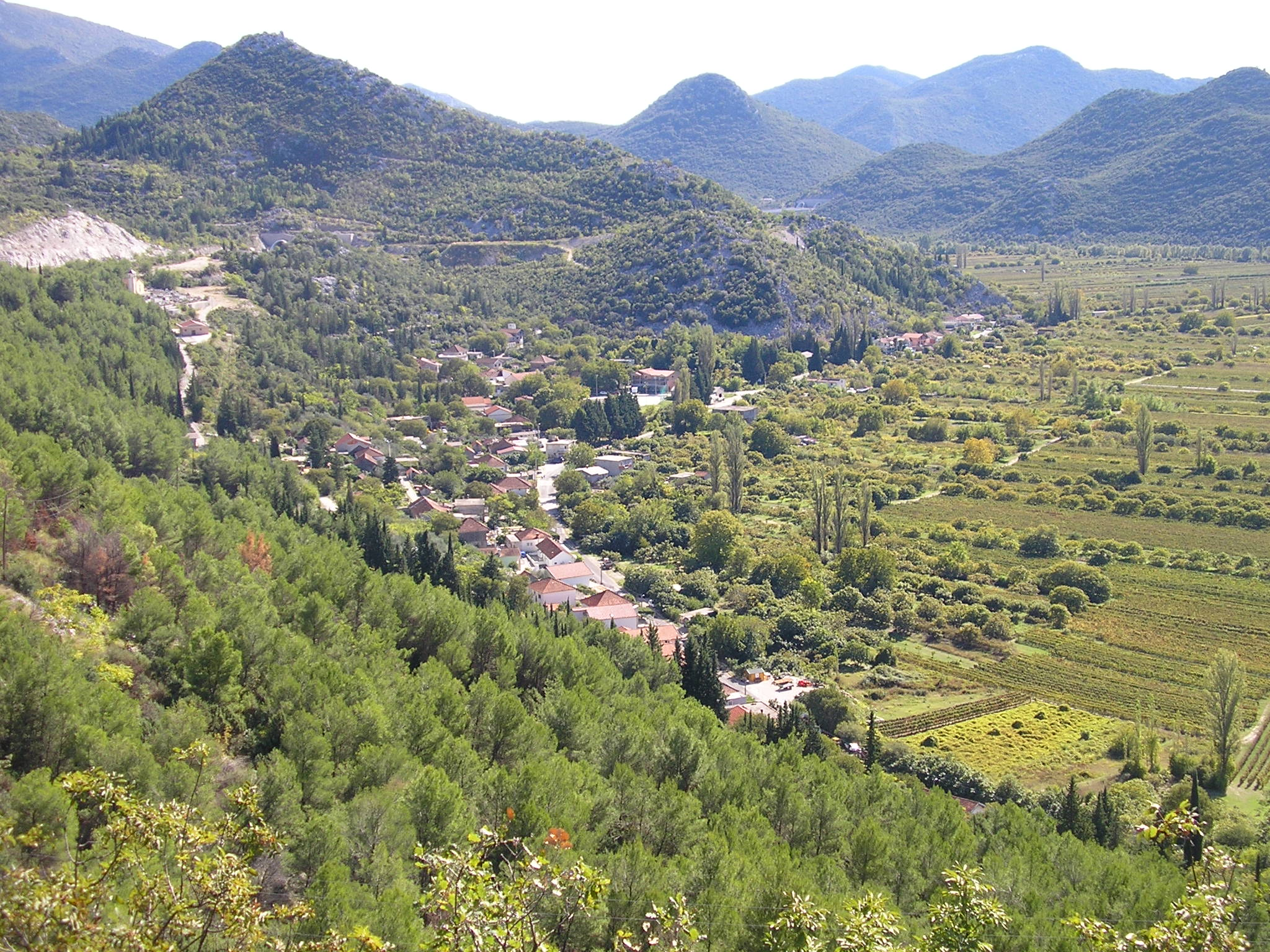

- Location within Croatia
- Coordinates: 43.129736°N 17.4601887°E
- Country: Croatia
- County: Dubrovnik-Neretva County
- Municipality: Pojezerje

Area
  - Total: 1.8 sq mi (4.6 km^{2})

Population (2021)
  - Total: 198
  - Density: 110/sq mi (43/km^{2})
- Time zone: UTC+1 (CET)
  - Summer (DST): UTC+2 (CEST)

Kobiljača is a village in southern Croatia.

== Demographics ==
According to the 2021 census, its population was 198.
