= Otrić-Seoci =

- Village
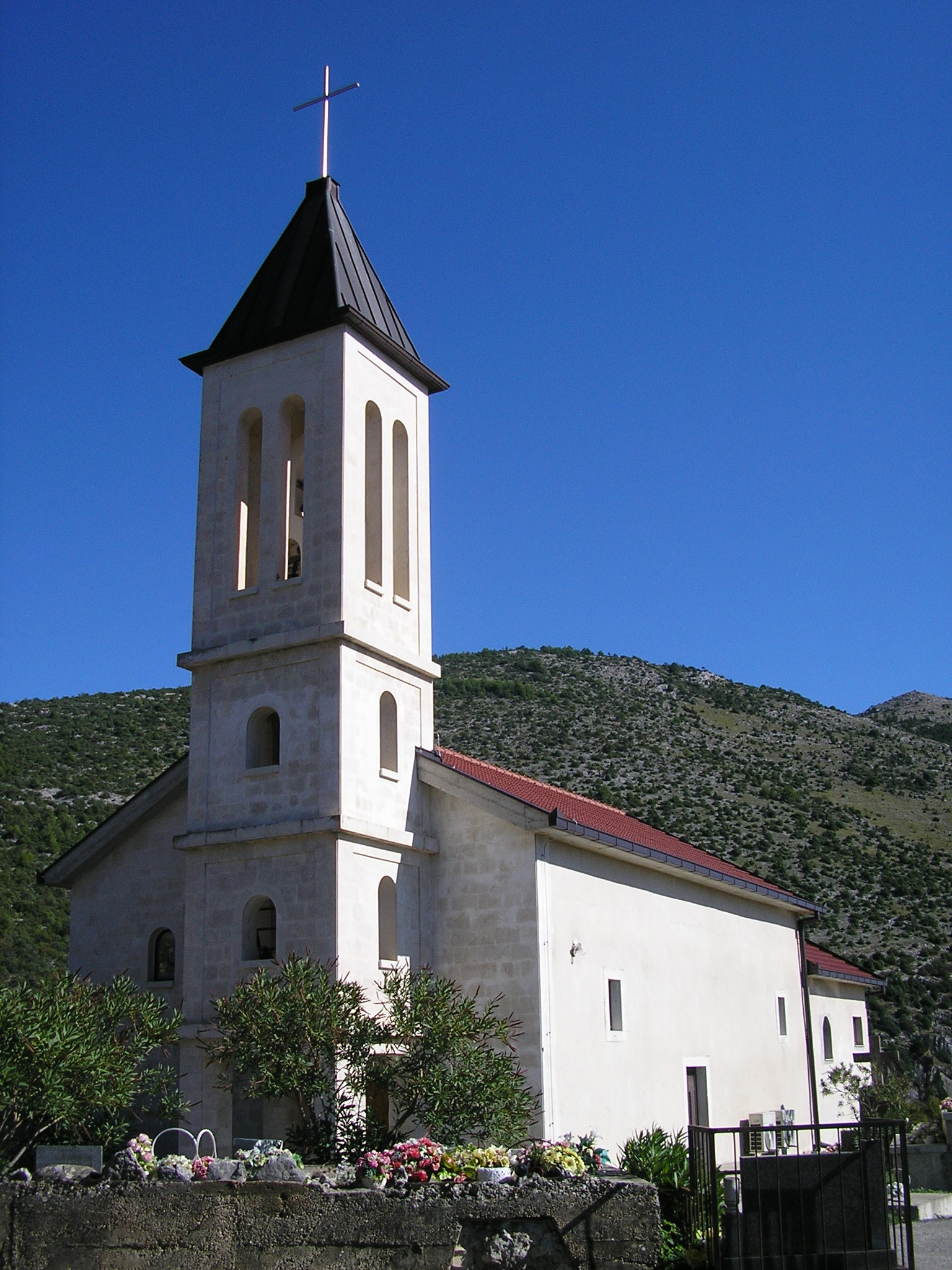
- Saint Nicholas' church in Otrić-Seoci

- Location within Croatia
- Coordinates: 43.15388°N 17.4371775°E
- Country: Croatia
- County: Dubrovnik-Neretva County
- Municipality: Pojezerje

Area
  - Total: 4.0 sq mi (10.3 km^{2})

Population (2021)
  - Total: 689
  - Density: 173/sq mi (66.9/km^{2})
- Time zone: UTC+1 (CET)
  - Summer (DST): UTC+2 (CEST)

Otrić-Seoci is a village in southern Croatia, located close to the border with Bosnia and Herzegovina. It is the largest village of the Pojezerje municipality.

== Demographics ==
According to the 2021 census, its population was 689.
