= Bonaventura Radonić =

- Born: February 12, 1888; Kotezi in Vrgorac
- Died: 1945 (aged 57); Zagreb, Yugoslavia
- Occupations: Franciscan, philosopher, priest, professor

Bonaventura Radonić (12 February 1888 – 1945) was a Croatian Franciscan, philosopher, Catholic priest and professor. He was executed by Yugoslav Partisans in 1945.

== Biography ==
He was born in Kotezi in Vrgorac on 12 February 1888. He attended classical gymnasium in Sinj and studied philosophy in Šibenik. He attended novitiate on Visovac island and was ordained in 1914. Two years later, he went in Innsbruck and Fribourg to further his education, after which he became a high school teacher in Sinj.

From 1936 to 1944 he was theology professor in Makarska. He was supporter of Croatian Peasant Party. In 1944 he went to Zagreb. Following the fall of Independent State of Croatia, he sought refuge in Austria, where soldiers of British Army returned him back to Slovenia. He was hidden in Maribor alongside a group of Franciscans in local Franciscan monastery. He was soon uncovered and Yugoslav Partisan imprisoned him in Zagreb. On 9 July 1945 he was sentenced to death penalty.
