= Pozla Gora =

- Village
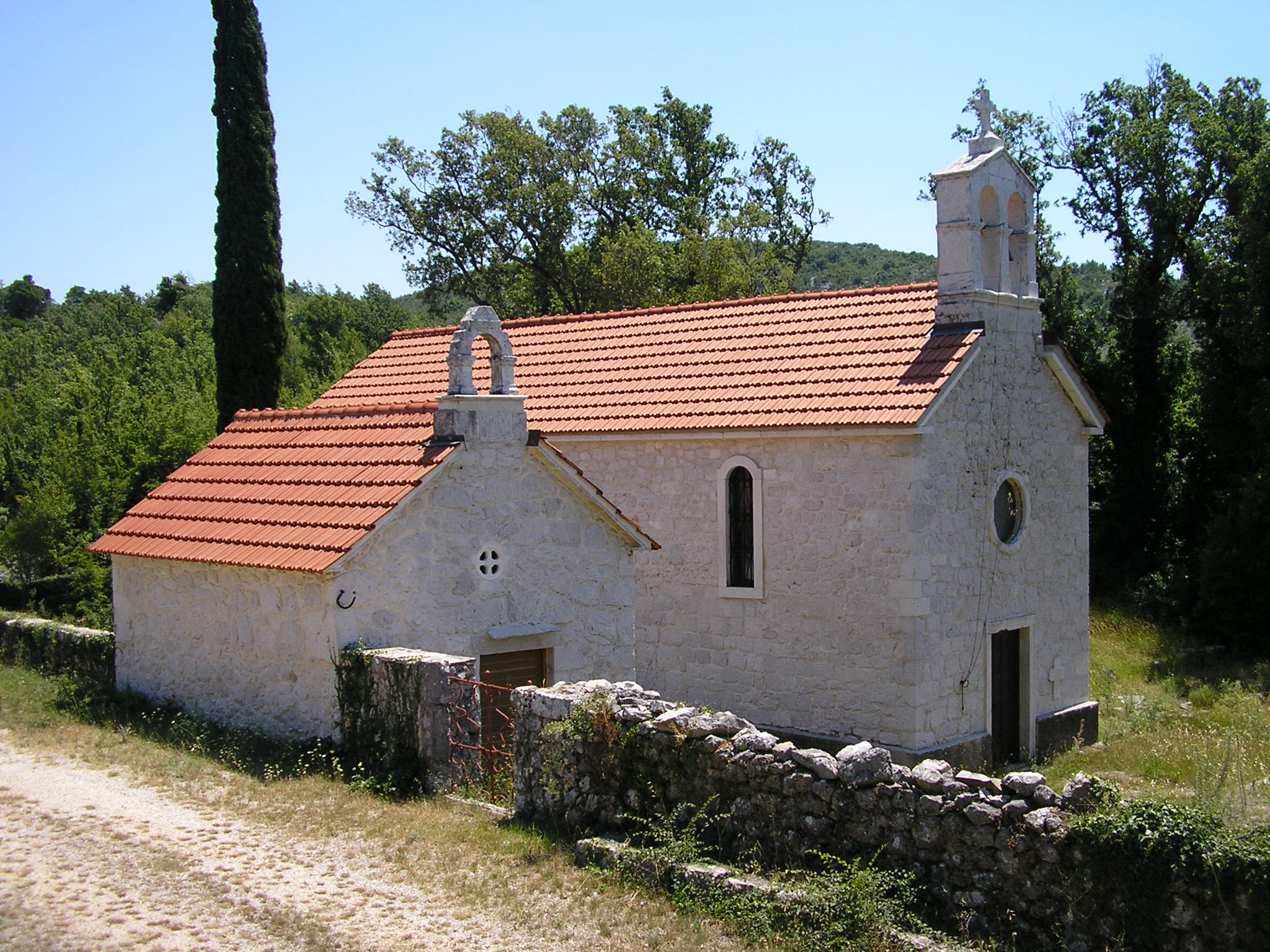

- Location within Croatia
- Coordinates: 43.130336°N 17.4948977°E
- Country: Croatia
- County: Dubrovnik-Neretva County
- Municipality: Pojezerje

Area
  - Total: 3.4 sq mi (8.7 km^{2})

Population (2021)
  - Total: 46
  - Density: 14/sq mi (5.3/km^{2})
- Time zone: UTC+1 (CET)
  - Summer (DST): UTC+2 (CEST)

Pozla Gora is a village in southern Croatia.

== Demographics ==
According to the 2021 census, its population was 46.
