= Pojezerje =

- Municipality
- Općina Pojezerje
- Interactive map of Pojezerje
- Location within Croatia
- Coordinates: 43°09′N 17°27′E
- Country: Croatia
- County: Dubrovnik-Neretva County

Government
  - Municipal mayor: Nediljko Dominiković

Area
  - Total: 32.8 km^{2} (12.7 sq mi)

Population (2021)
  - Total: 943
  - Density: 28.8/km^{2} (74.5/sq mi)
- Time zone: UTC+1 (CET)
  - Summer (DST): UTC+2 (CEST)
- Postal code: 20342
- Area code: 020
- Website: pojezerje.hr

Pojezerje is a municipality of Dubrovnik-Neretva County in the southwest of Croatia.

== Demographics ==
The municipality had a population of 1,223 in 2001, of which the absolute majority were Croats (98%).

In 2021, the municipality had 943 residents in the following 6 settlements:

- Brečići, population 0
- Dubrave, population 0
- Kobiljača, population 198
- Mali Prolog, population 10
- Otrić-Seoci, population 689
- Pozla Gora, population 46
Pojezerje: Population trends 1857–2021
v

population	725	859	995	1123	1325	1455	1596	1469	1704	1768	1723	1612	1446	1394	1233	991	943
	1857	1869	1880	1890	1900	1910	1921	1931	1948	1953	1961	1971	1981	1991	2001	2011	2021

Sources: Croatian Bureau of Statistics publications
