= Kozica, Vrgorac =

Village in Split-Dalmatia County, Croatia

Kozica
- Village
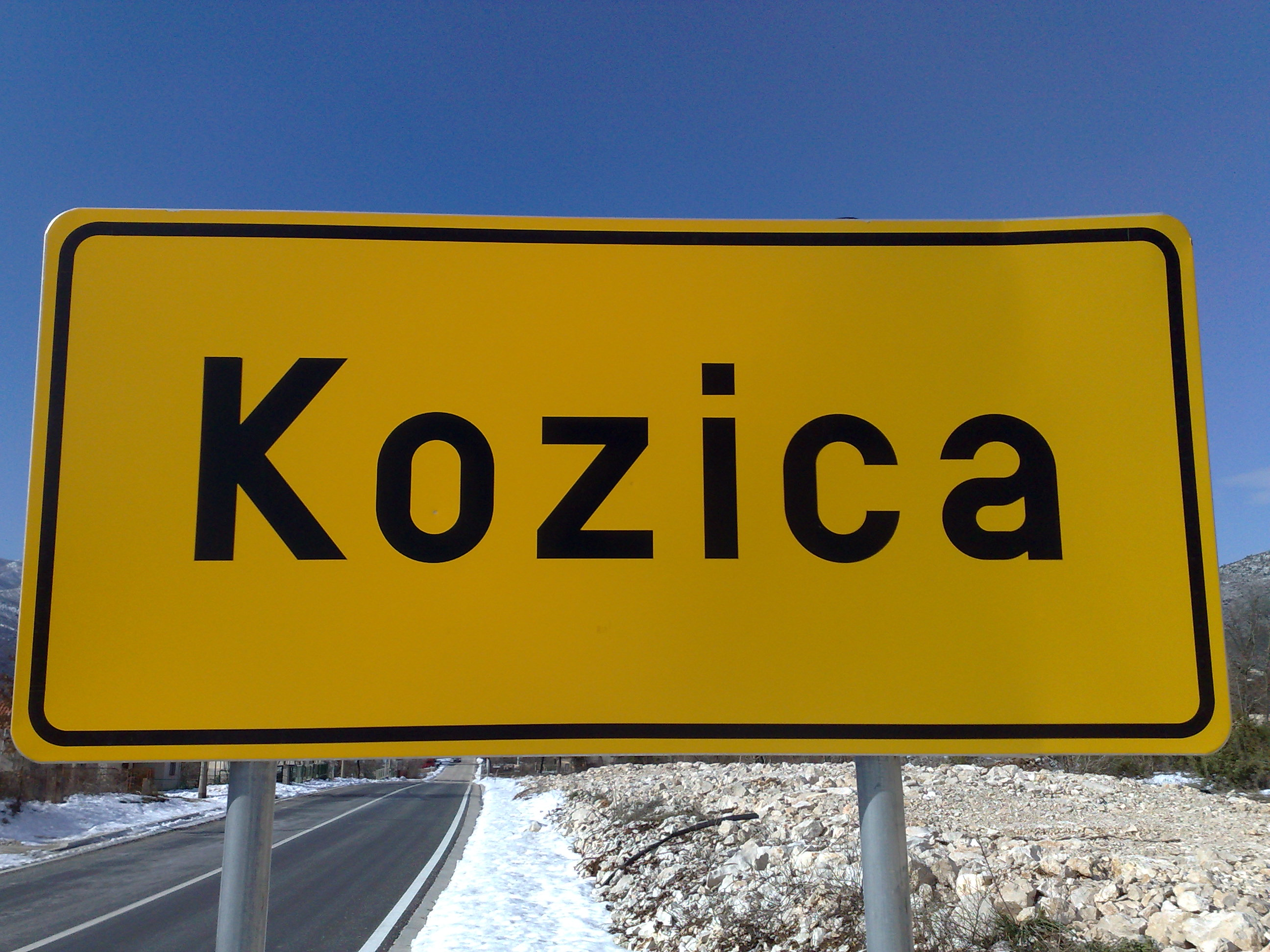
- A sign at the entrance to Kozica

- Location within Croatia
- Coordinates: 43.261691°N 17.217076°E
- Country: Croatia
- Historical region: Dalmatian Hinterland
- County: Split-Dalmatia
- Town: Vrgorac

Area
  - Total: 24.6 km^{2} (9.5 sq mi)
- Elevation: 350 m (1,150 ft)

Population (2021)
  - Total: 34
  - Density: 1.4/km^{2} (3.6/sq mi)
- Time zone: UTC+1 (CET)
  - Summer (DST): UTC+2 (CEST)
- Postal Code: 21274
- Area code: 021
- Licence plate: MA
- Climate: Cfa

Kozica is a small village in the Split-Dalmatia County of Croatia. It is in the jurisdiction of Vrgorac, 80 km (50 mi) southeast of Split. It is located at the base of the Sveti Mihovil mountain, which is 1,247 m (4,091 ft) high.

== History ==
Kozica was first mentioned in documents of the Kreševskoj era in 1434.

=== Prehistory ===
There are more than sixteen ancient burial sites surrounding Kozica, dating from circa. 1900 B.C. to the late Medieval period. Nearby there are tumuli and stećci, evidence of the habitation of ancient cattle breeders and warriors.

=== Ottoman Empire ===
When Vrgorac capitulated to the Ottoman Empire, Kozica most likely fell with the rest of the area. The spread of Islam into the region that came with the arrival of the Ottoman army concerned the occupants of the monastery in Makarska, who began to worry about the residents in Kozica and the surrounding region, fearing that many would convert to Islam.

=== Post-Ottoman occupation ===
After the liberation of inner Dalmatia from the Ottoman Empire, most of Kozica and the surrounding villages had been deserted because of the exodus of the populace to the northern regions of Croatia. The Venetian Republic repopulated the area with Herzegovinian people from the east.

The withdrawal of the Ottomans saw the region come under the jurisdiction of the Venetian Republic, and subsequently under the rule of Napoleon. A short and prosperous period followed, which included the construction of the "napoleonska cesta" (Napoleon's road), encouraging travel to the area. With the failure of Napoleon's campaign in Dalmatia, Kozica fell under the rule of Austria-Hungary and remained so until the end of the First World War.

=== Kingdom of Serbs, Croats and Slovenes (1918–1941) and World War II ===
Many of Kozica's population bought land near Vrgorac, where they grew their own produce, including olives and grapes. The area subsequently acquired a reputation for good wine.

The Second World War had devastating consequences for the village; all houses in the village were burnt down, and 20% of the villagers were killed by either Chetnik or Italian units, or in combat, fighting for the Partisans.

=== The Parish of St. Elijah the prophet ===
The Church of St. Elijah in Kozica was built between 1765 and 1785 and was rebuilt at the end of the 19th century. It is a spacious one-nave church with a spacious semicircular apse in the north.
The church is 19.60 meters long, 7 meters wide and 8.50 meters high, built of stone blocks arranged in rows. On the main facade above the entrance door is a simple stone rosette, two monophores with a stone cross at the top of the gable. The side facades are broken down with two smaller monophores and a side entrance door to the west side. The interior of the church consists of a nave and a narrow sanctuary raised by two steps. The interior walls of the church and the ceiling are mostly painted. Three wooden altars, from the Rako workshop have been preserved in the church, dating from the second half of the 19th century. On the main altar is a wooden statue of St. Elijah the Prophet, and the other two altars are dedicated to Our Lady and St. Anthony of Padua.
A bell tower was erected in the 1990s, then renewed in 2012. A bell from 1793 is preserved in the belfry, along with two other bells from 1930. The bell tower is 14 meters high. The Church of St Elijah in Kozica, with its simple and harmonious architectural design and preserved interior, represents a valuable cultural monument of Zabiokovlje.
The Parish of St. Elijah is part of the Biokovo deanery, and it was canonically founded in 1763. It is pastorally served by the Franciscans of the Province of the Holy Redeemer whose headquarters are in Split. The oldest information about the pastor dates to 1720. In terms of the number of parishioners, the Parish of St Elijah is the smallest – within the Archdiocese of Split-Makarska (in 2023, 19 people lived on the territory of the parish).
The parish has one cemetery beside the old St. Elijah church, which serves now as the cemetery chapel.
The old parish house was built in the first half of the 19th century on an old foundation. It was set on fire on 29 August 1942, by the Chetniks, who killed the pastor, Fr. Ladislav Ivanković, along with 67 civilians from Kozica that same day.
In 1991, a new rectory was built along the so-called "Napoleon Road" (at the crossroads to Makarska).
The Church of St. Elijah in Kozica is an immovable cultural asset of the Republic of Croatia.

== Climate ==
Kozica has a Sub-Mediterranean climate, but due to its elevation, Kozica has its own microclimate which differs from the Dalmatian Coast. Kozica is situated on a plateau between two mountains, Biokovo and Sveti Mihovil.

== Tourism and the economy ==
Tourism has started in Kozica and it is becoming common for cyclists to tour the region and its rocky landscape. Kozica's natural environment is also an attraction in the summer. Kozica is a small Mediterranean mountain village which is 20 minutes by car from the nearest beach. Kozica is also home to various palm trees and many other types of flora. Tourism in Kozica is expected to increase with the construction of the A1 highway from Zagreb via Split to Dubrovnik. The nearest motorway exit for Kozica is Ravča which is 3–4 km (1.9–2.5 mi) south of Kozica.

== Demographics ==
Population trends 1857–2011
v

population	611	666	779	904	1026	1106	1139	1093	736	756	701	481	258	196	109	52
	1857	1869	1880	1890	1900	1910	1921	1931	1948	1953	1961	1971	1981	1991	2001	2011

Sources: Croatian Bureau of Statistics publications

There was an increase in population from the 1800s until the Second World War. After 1945 the decrease in population was due to the exodus of people trying to find a better life in the cities or migrating. In recent decades, there was a dramatic drop from previous censuses. Many inhabitants have moved to the seaside, Makarska in particular.

== Gallery ==
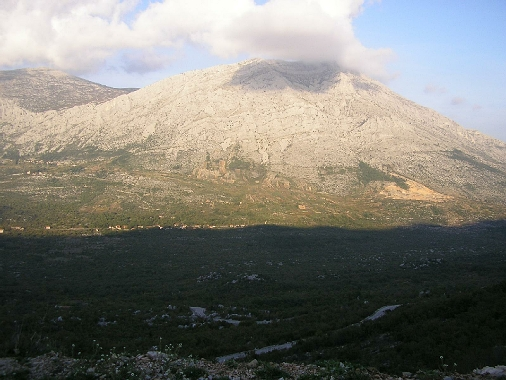
Kozica from Biokovo

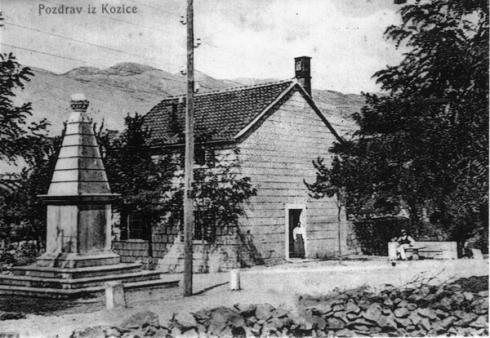
A postcard of Kozica believed to be from 1900

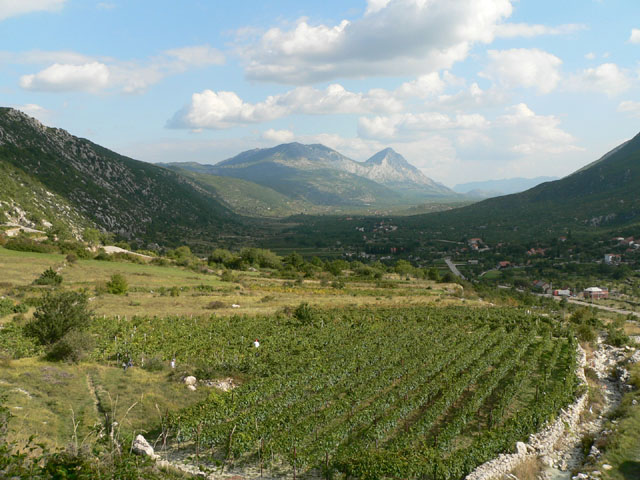
Kozica, a view from the north
