= Rašćane, Vrgorac =

Settlement in Split-Dalmatia County, Croatia

Rašćane
- Settlement
- Interactive map of Rašćane
- Location of Rašćane in Croatia
- Coordinates: 43°17′46″N 17°10′44″E
- Country: Croatia
- County: Split-Dalmatia
- City: Vrgorac

Area
  - Total: 32.4 km^{2} (12.5 sq mi)

Population (2021)
  - Total: 107
  - Density: 3.30/km^{2} (8.55/sq mi)
- Time zone: UTC+1 (CET)
  - Summer (DST): UTC+2 (CEST)
- Postal code: 21270 Zagvozd
- Area code: +385 (0)21

Rašćane is a settlement within the area of the City of Vrgorac in Croatia. In 2021, its population was 107.

== Demographics ==
Rašćane: Population trends 1857–2021
v

population	749	876	949	1160	1362	1483	1435	1389	1428	904	843	586	375	316	204	130	107
	1857	1869	1880	1890	1900	1910	1921	1931	1948	1953	1961	1971	1981	1991	2001	2011	2021

Sources: Croatian Bureau of Statistics publications

== Landmarks ==
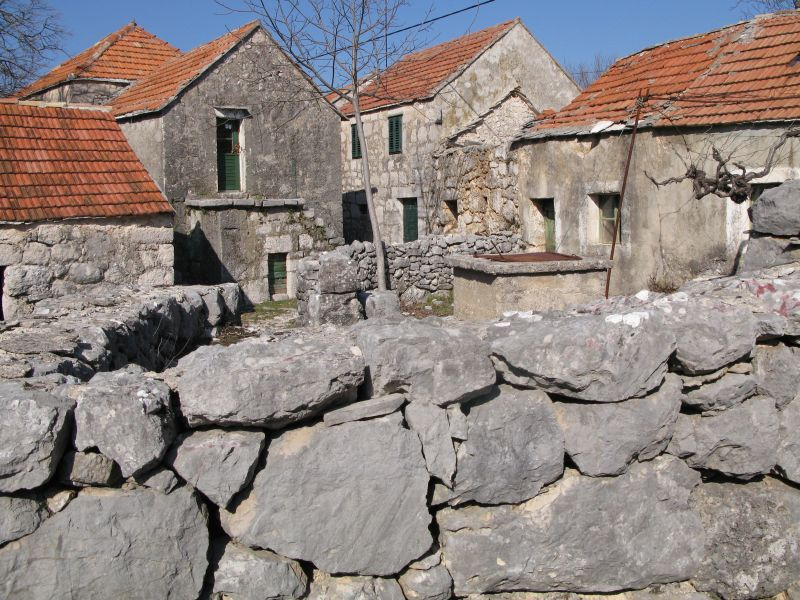
Veliki Godinj, hamlet Pavlinovići

A hamlet within Rašćane, Veliki Godinj is a preserved cultural heritage site of Croatia. It is located on the northwestern slopes of the Biokovo mountain, some 2 km from the center of Rašćane. The settlement has a rural historical matrix, traditional architecture with stone houses, paved stone streets, water drainage channels, living quarters separate from stables and areas for threshing grain. It is a well-organized agricultural landscape without modern interventions. A nearby chapel dedicated to St. Anthony has been built in the spirit of folk expressionism.
