= A10 (Croatia) =

Shortest motorway in Croatia

A10 motorway
- Autocesta A10
- planned other motorways

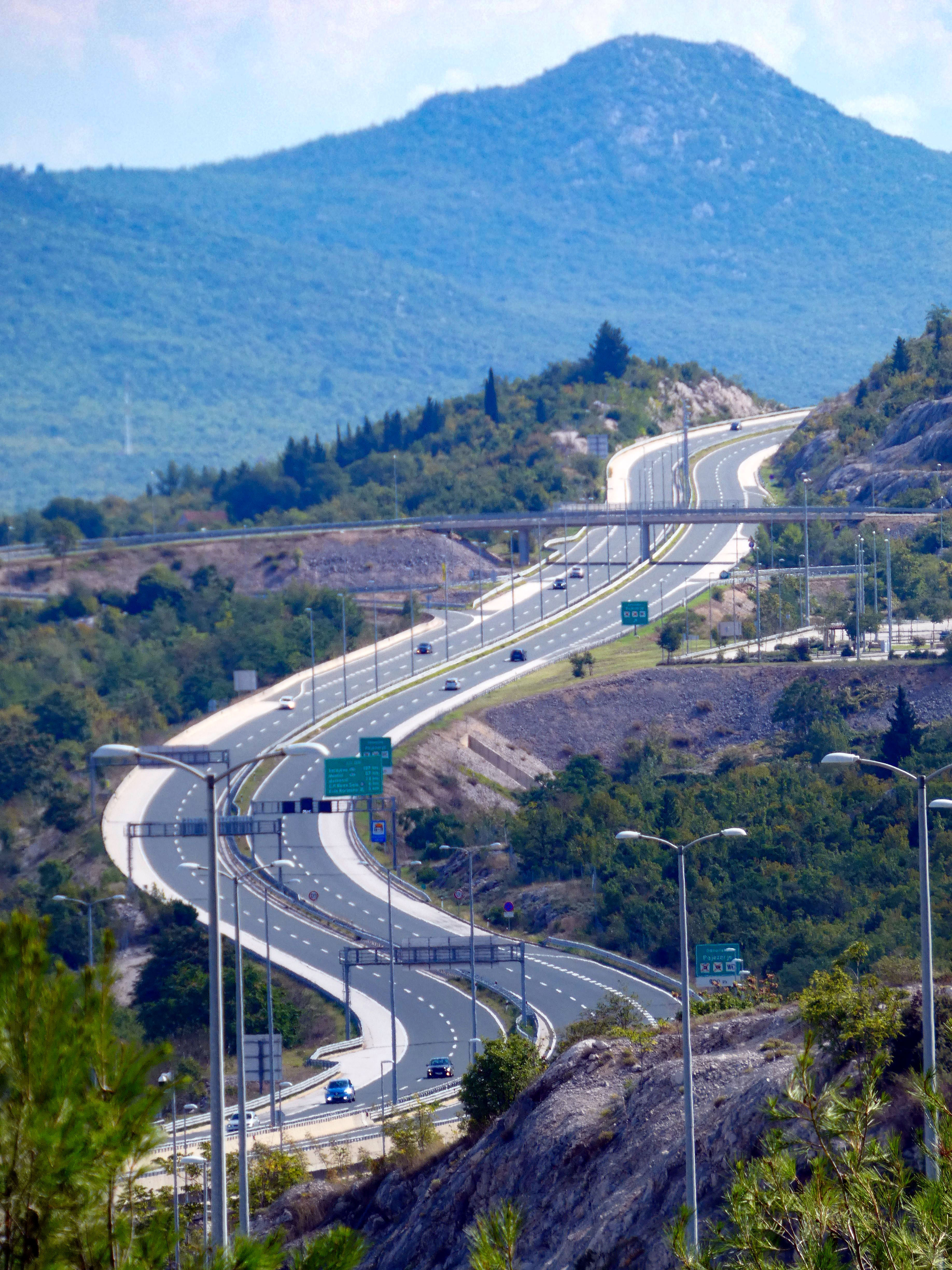

Route information
- Part of
- Length: 8.4 km (5.2 mi)

Major junctions
- From: A1 at Nova Sela border crossing
- D62 near Kula Norinska
- To: A1 Ploče interchange

Location
- Country: Croatia
- Counties: Dubrovnik-Neretva

Highway system
- Highways in Croatia

The A10 motorway (Croatian: Autocesta A10) is a motorway in southern Croatia extending from the border with Bosnia and Herzegovina to the Croatian A1 motorway Ploče interchange. The motorway includes the Nova Sela border crossing. It connects to the A1 motorway in Bosnia and Herzegovina. The motorway is 8.4 km (5.2 mi) long. It is the shortest motorway in Croatia, but still important as a part of the Pan-European Corridor Vc.

== History ==
On 15 May 2007, the Croatian Government and the Government of Bosnia and Herzegovina signed a Protocol on cooperation that defined the contact point of the Croatian and Bosnian-Herzegovinian motorways on the Corridor Vc, which caused a significant alteration of the Croatian A1 route near Vrgorac as well as a complete revamp of the A10 route.

Scheduled in 2011 to open in 2013, the A10 was opened in late 2013.

== Traffic volume ==
Traffic is regularly counted and reported by Hrvatske autoceste, the operator of the motorway, and the results are published by Hrvatske ceste. The volume tracked includes the annual average daily traffic (AADT) and average summer daily traffic (ASDT).

A10 traffic volume details
Road	Counting site	AADT	ASDT	Notes
A10	6105 Ploče interchange - east	1,804	3,601	Between Kula Norinska and Ploče interchanges.
A10	6106 Čarapine	890	1,736	Toll plaza.

== Exit list ==
County	km	Exit	Name	Destination	Notes
Dubrovnik-Neretva	0.4		Nova Sela border crossing	A1 E73	Nova Sela border crossing to Bosnia and Herzegovina, where the road continues as the A1 motorway towards Mostar. The eastern terminus of the motorway.
Dubrovnik-Neretva	0.9	1	Kula Norinska	D62	Connection to Kula Norinska and Metković (D9).
Dubrovnik-Neretva	1.6		Čarapine toll plaza		
Dubrovnik-Neretva	3.3	2	Metković interchange	A1 E65	A further extension of the motorway to Pelješac bridge and Dubrovnik is planned.
Dubrovnik-Neretva	6.0	Parking area traffic sign	Pojezerje rest area		
Dubrovnik-Neretva	8.4	3	Ploče interchange	A1 E65 E73	Connection to Ploče (via the D425) and Split (via the A1). The western terminus of the motorway.
1.000 mi = 1.609 km; 1.000 km = 0.621 mi
