= Mali Prolog =

- Village
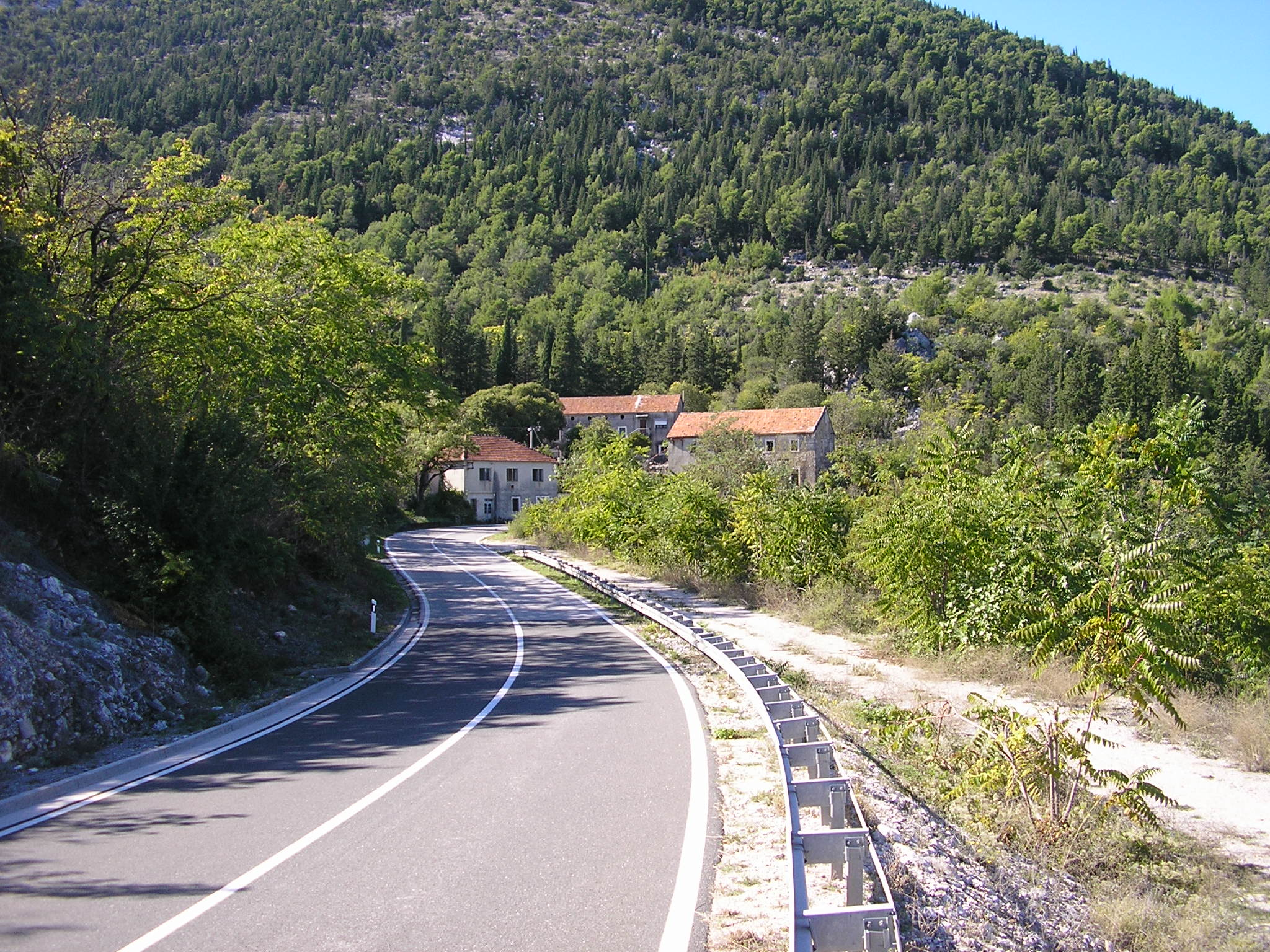

- Location within Croatia
- Coordinates: 43°8′46″N 17°29′2″E
- Country: Croatia
- County: Dubrovnik-Neretva County
- Municipality: Pojezerje

Area
  - Total: 1.5 sq mi (3.9 km^{2})

Population (2021)
  - Total: 10
  - Density: 6.6/sq mi (2.6/km^{2})
- Time zone: UTC+1 (CET)
  - Summer (DST): UTC+2 (CEST)

Mali Prolog is a village in Dubrovnik-Neretva County, Croatia on the border with Bosnia and Herzegovina. It is connected by the D222 highway, just northwest of Pojezerje.

== Demographics ==
According to the 2021 census, its population was only 10. In 2001 it had a population of 55.
