= Ravča =

- Village
- Location within Croatia
- Coordinates: 43°12′33″N 17°18′18″E
- Country: Croatia
- County: Split-Dalmatia County
- Town: Vrgorac

Area
  - Total: 9.9 km^{2} (3.8 sq mi)

Population (2021)
  - Total: 123
  - Density: 12/km^{2} (32/sq mi)
- Time zone: UTC+1 (CET)
  - Summer (DST): UTC+2 (CEST)
- Postal code: 21276 Vrgorac
- Area code: +385 21
- Climate: Cfa

Ravča is a village in Croatia. It is connected by the D62 and D512 roads. Since December 2008, the A1 motorway has an eponymous exit located west of the village.
