= Veliki Prolog =

Coordinates: 43°11′N 17°26′E

- Village
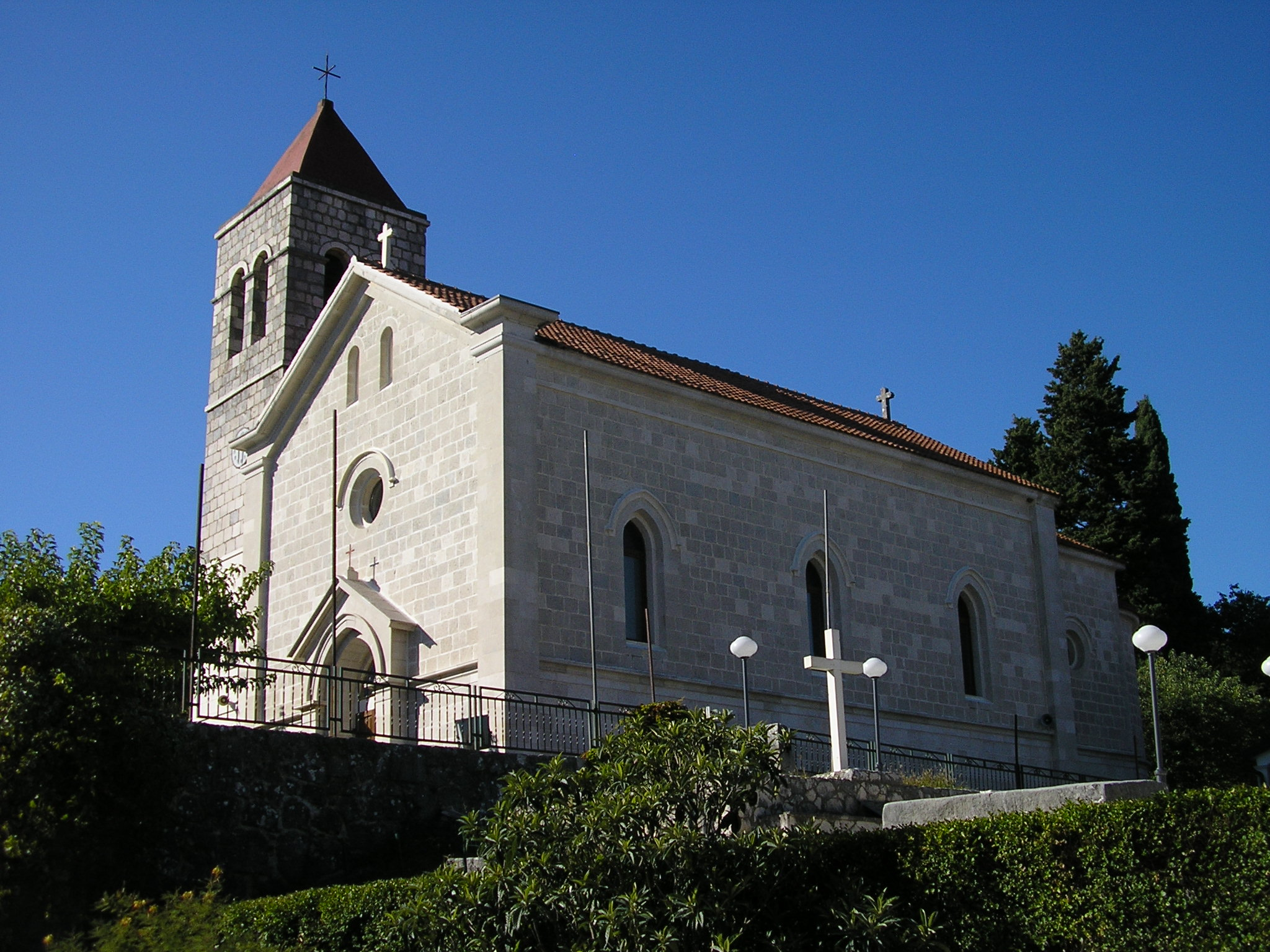
- Church of Assumption of Mary in Veliki Prolog
- Interactive map of Veliki Prolog
- Country: Croatia
- Region: Split-Dalmatia

Area
  - Total: 1.8 sq mi (4.6 km^{2})

Population (2021)
  - Total: 317
  - Density: 180/sq mi (69/km^{2})
- Time zone: UTC+1 (CET)
  - Summer (DST): UTC+2 (CEST)
- Postal code: 21277
- Climate: Cfa

Veliki Prolog is a village in Croatia.
