= Vrgorac =

Town in Dalmatia, Croatia

- Town
- Grad Vrgorac; Town of Vrgorac
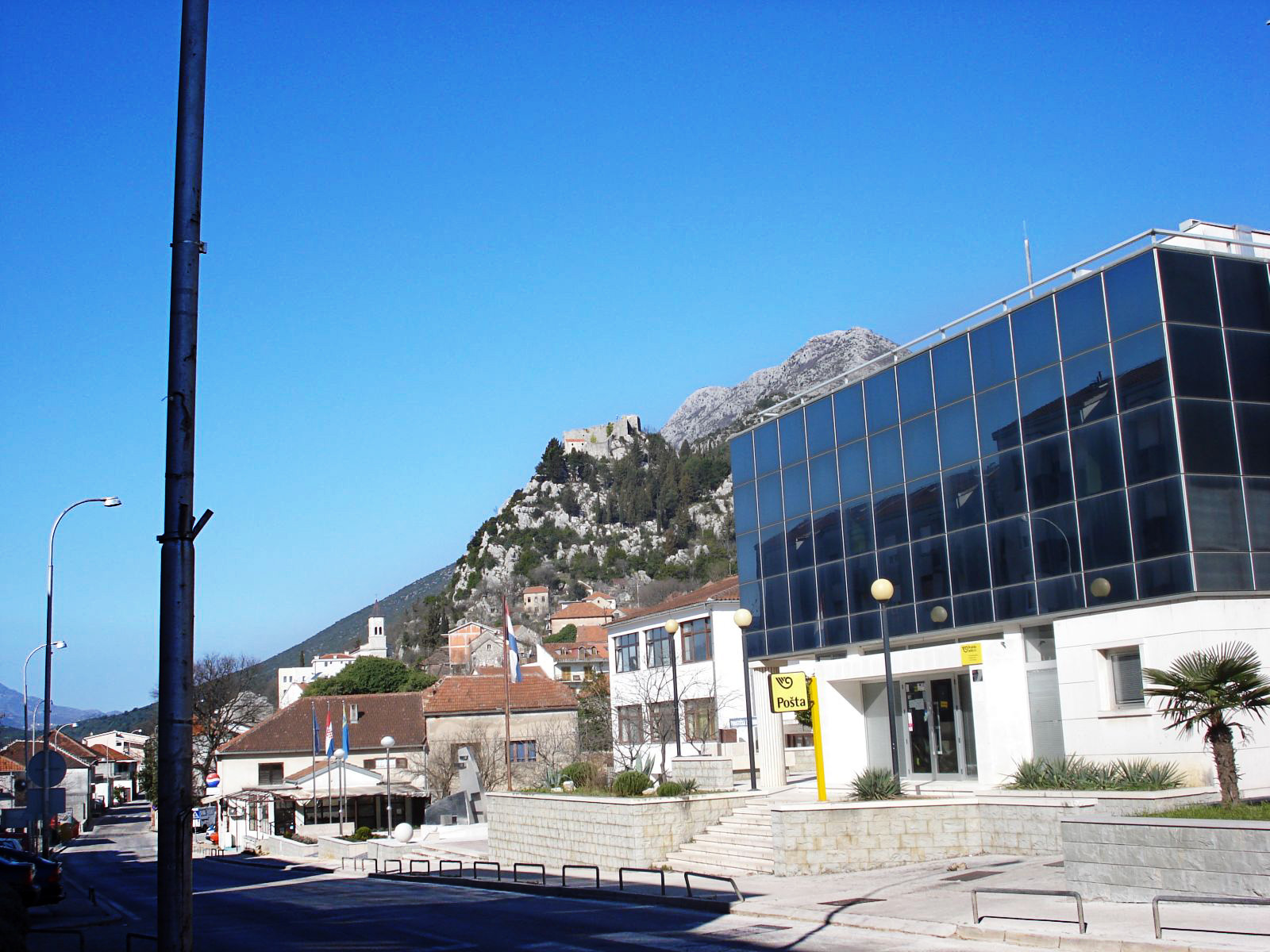
- Tin Ujević Street in Vrgorac

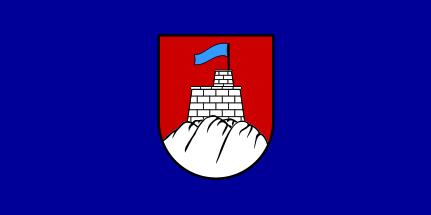
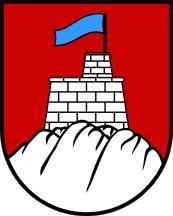
- Flag Coat of arms
- Interactive map of Vrgorac
- Location of Vrgorac in Croatia
- Coordinates: 43.20°N 17.37°E
- Country: Croatia
- Region: Dalmatian Hinterland
- County: Split-Dalmatia County

Government
  - Mayor: Mile Herceg (NLM)

Area
  - Town: 278.6 km^{2} (107.6 sq mi)
  - Urban: 13.1 km^{2} (5.1 sq mi)

Population (2021)
  - Town: 5,698
  - Density: 20.45/km^{2} (52.97/sq mi)
  - Urban: 2,132
  - Urban density: 163/km^{2} (422/sq mi)
- Time zone: UTC+1 (CET)
  - Summer (DST): UTC+2 (CEST)
- Postal code: 21276
- Area code: 021
- Climate: Cfa
- Website: vrgorac.hr

Vrgorac (pronounced [ʋř̩ɡorats]) is a town in Croatia in the Split-Dalmatia County.

== Climate ==
Since records began in 1981, the highest temperature recorded at the local weather station was 41.0 °C (105.8 °F), on 4 August 2017. The coldest temperature was −15.0 °C (5.0 °F), on 7 January 2017.

== Demographics ==
The total population of Vrgorac is 6,572 (census 2011), in the following settlements:

- Banja, population 202
- Dragljane, population 52
- Draževitići, population 203
- Duge Njive, population 105
- Dusina, population 494
- Kljenak, population 86
- Kokorići, population 161
- Kotezi, population 278
- Kozica, population 56
- Mijaca, population 95
- Orah, population 268
- Podprolog, population 355
- Poljica Kozička, population 172
- Prapatnice, population 179
- Rašćane, population 130
- Ravča, population 154
- Stilja, population 320
- Umčani, population 227
- Veliki Prolog, population 499
- Vina, population 134
- Višnjica, population 14
- Vlaka, population 41
- Vrgorac, population 2,039
- Zavojane, population 308

In the 2011 census, 99% of the population were Croats.

Town of Vrgorac: Population trends 1857–2021
v

population	7618	7865	8701	10251	11910	12859	12838	12756	11621	11612	11246	9927	8228	7497	7593	6572	5698
	1857	1869	1880	1890	1900	1910	1921	1931	1948	1953	1961	1971	1981	1991	2001	2011	2021

Sources: Croatian Bureau of Statistics publications

== Prehistory ==
In the area Veliki Vanik two early or middle Bronze Age individuals were found, probably Proto-Illyrians, one was genetically determined as haplogroup J2b2a1.

== World War II ==
Following the invasion and occupation of Yugoslavia by the Axis powers in April 1941, Vrgorac was incorporated de jure into the Independent State of Croatia, however the town was militarily occupied by Fascist Italy.

On 15 June 1942, the Yugoslav Partisans captured Vrgorac town and occupied it for one day, during which they carried out executions and looting before they were forced out. Two months later on 29 August, collaborationist Chetniks massacred 145 Croat civilians including three priests in the villages of Vrgorac at the end of anti-partisan Operation "Albia".

== Notable people ==
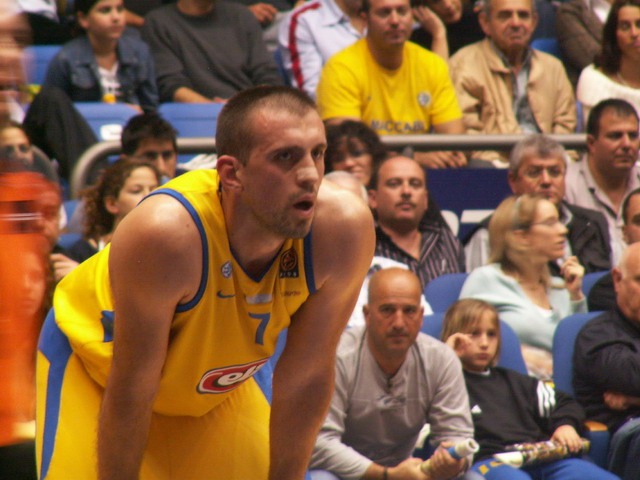
Nikola Vujčić

- Tin Ujević (1891–1955), poet
- Stipe Božić (born 1951), mountaineer, filmmaker, photographer; second European to climb Mt. Everest twice.
- Nikola Vujčić (born 1978), basketball player and team manager of Maccabi Tel Aviv
- Bonaventura Radonić (1888-1945), Franciscan, philosopher, professor
