= Dragutin Brahm =

Croatian mountain climber

Dragutin Brahm (26 August 1909, Zagreb – 27 June 1938, Starigrad) was a Yugoslav mountain climber. He died while attempting the first ascent of the Anića kuk wall in the Paklenica climbing area, making him the first casualty in the history of Croatian rock climbing.

== Life in brief ==
House painter and decorator by profession, Brahm was noted in his early age as table tennis player and skier. He obtained various positions with Zagreb-based Cepin Alpine Club. Apart from climbing in the western parts of the Dinaric Alps, in the early 1930s Brahm bagged successfully the summits of Jalovec, (Couloir route), Triglav over the north face, and Grossglockner.

== Death and aftermath ==
On June 26, 1938, shortly after midnight, Brahm and three others took a train from Zagreb to Gračac. From there, they hired a car to Obrovac where they boarded a boat for Starigrad. At 3 a.m. the next day, they hiked into Paklenica gorge to the foot of the 350 m high Anića kuk face. After a six-hour climb and about 3/4 of the route completed, Brahm fell 8 metres (26 ft), his head bouncing off the rock and his body landed in squat position on the ledge where his belaying partner was. Despite the rescue effort - the other two went for help to Starigrad and came back with mule loaded with 300 metres (980 ft) of fishermans rope - it turned to be all in vain as Brahm was dead already due to severe skull fracture.

Once his partner unbelayed Brahm's corpse, already dead Brahm leaned backwards and fell again, this time the entire length of the Anića kuk face.

In the two years following the accident, no other climbing attempt in Paklenica occurred. On the 2nd anniversary of Brahm's death (June 27, 1940), Marijan Dragman/Drago Brezovečki party completed the unfinished job. The route was named in honor of Brahm. These days, the Brahm route is considered the classic, and it is the oldest climbing route at the entire Paklenica climbing site.
