= Seline, Croatia =

Seline
- Location within Croatia
- Coordinates: 44°16′38″N 15°28′47.7″E
- Country: Croatia
- County: Zadar
- Municipality: Starigrad

Area
  - Total: 50.3 km^{2} (19.4 sq mi)

Population (2021)
  - Total: 414
  - Density: 8.23/km^{2} (21.3/sq mi)
- Time zone: UTC+1 (CET)
  - Summer (DST): UTC+2 (CEST)

Seline is a village in the Starigrad municipality of Zadar County, Croatia. Seline has a population of 455 (census 2001). The population is by and large Croatian.

The town's church was recently refurbished and sits proudly on the main square, Trg Zukve, and is called Sacred Heart Church .

== Name ==
Its Italian name is Saline.

== Jabukovac ==
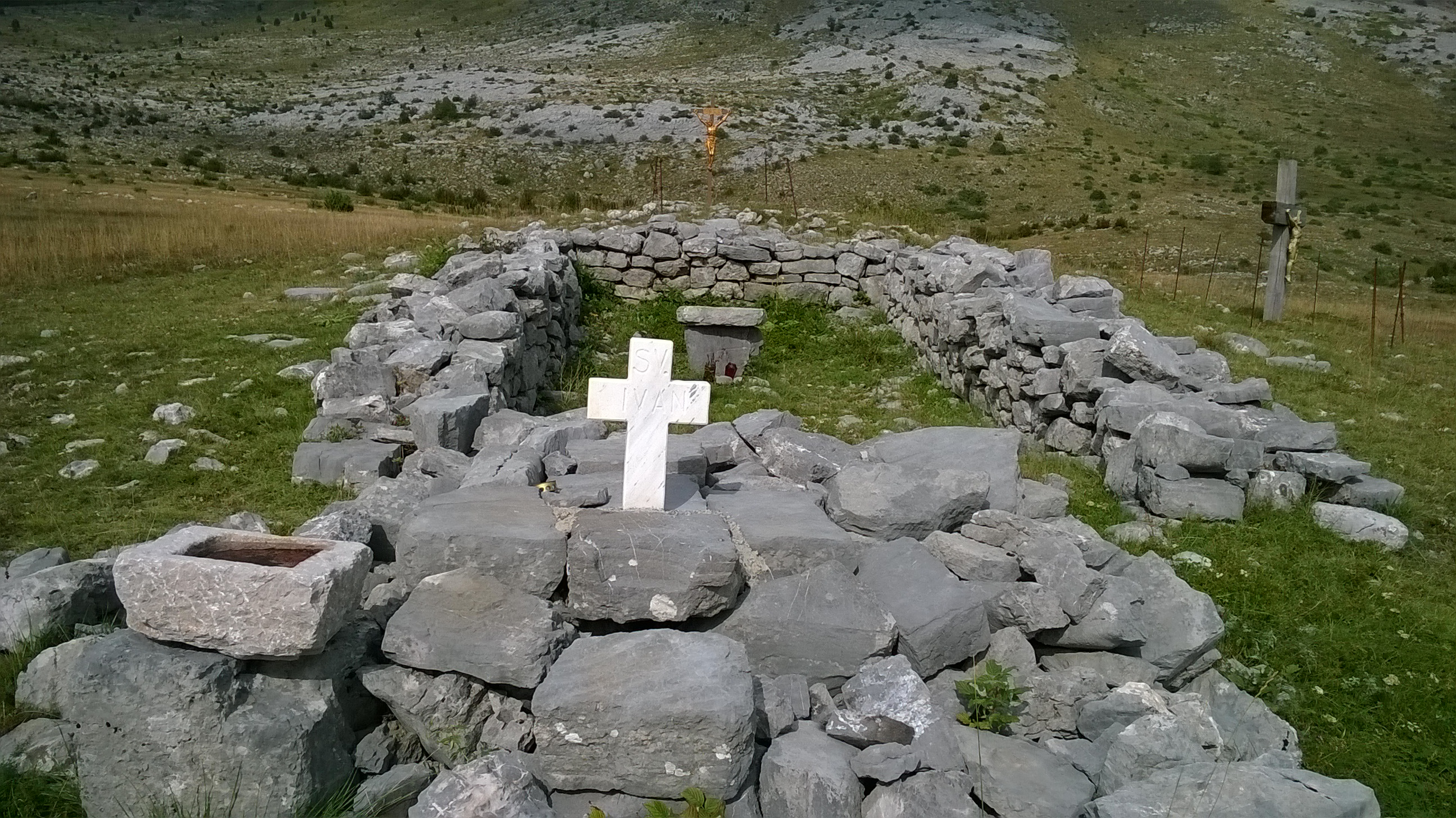
Remains of Saint Ivan chapel above Seline

Above Seline lies the town of Jabukovac ('jabuka' means 'apple' in Croatian) where according to legend a Turkish merchant by the name of Jusuf who traded in gold, 800 years ago sailed to Zadar, fell in love at first sight, offered a girl from Seline a golden apple and she took this apple and was wed to him.

Jusuf and his wife enjoyed many years of wedded supreme bliss and jubilation traveling between Zadar and Turkey. Jusuf went on to battle and died, while the child his wife bore became the beginning of the family of Jusuf, later Croatianised to Jusup.

The old town of Jabukovac, and the road and path known as 'Put Jabukovca, 23244, Seline, Croatia' are named in honour of the Jusuf love at first sight legend.

Until 200 years ago all of Seline's inhabitants lived in the old town of Jabukovac, situated above Seline, as it was far from the sea where pirates could not see the light from their fires and was therefore more secure.

== Occupations ==
The chief occupations include farming, livestock breeding, fishing and tourism.

== Attractions ==
Seline has a long shingle beach with tamarisk trees. Seline offers foods including dry figs, brandy, wine, cheese, honey, and seafood suitable for a holiday resort.

Nearby Paklenica National Park is used for hiking. At the foot of the hill are the hamlets of Bucici, Jukici, Jurline named after the surnames of their inhabitants; the names are still in use.
