= Paklenica =

Paklenica National Park
- Nacionalni park Paklenica (Croatian)
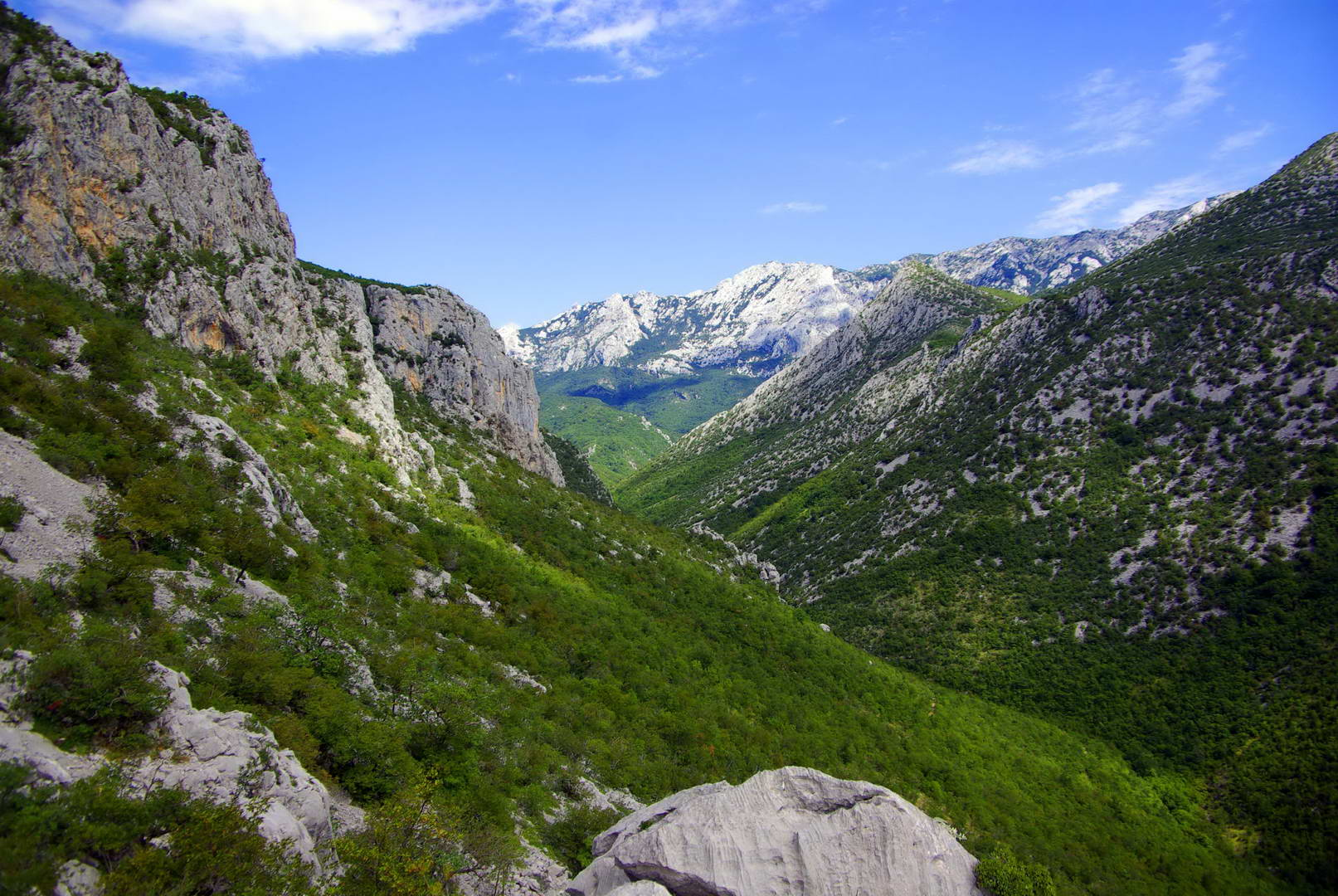
- Velika Paklenica

- Location within Croatia
- Interactive map of Paklenica National Park
- 44°22′N 15°26′E
- Location: Zadar County, Croatia

Site notes
- Area: 95 km^{2} (37 sq mi)
- Governing body: Paklenica National Park

Protected Natural Value of Croatia
- Official name: Nacionalni park Paklenica

The Paklenica karst river canyon is a national park in Croatia. It is near Starigrad, northern Dalmatia, on the southern slopes of Velebit mountain, not far from Zadar. It contains two canyons, Mala (Small) and Velika (Big) Paklenica.

== History ==
The area of South Velebit has been inhabited since prehistoric times. It is believed that, during the last ice age, the area was probably inhabited by small groups of Paleolithic hunters/gatherers, as elsewhere in the Mediterranean. Sea level must have been 120 metres (390 ft) lower than today, and the Velebit Channel was a wide valley with a river flowing through it. The highest parts of the Velebit were covered with glaciers. When sea level began to rise in the late ice age, people moved to higher, hilly areas. The earliest records of humans in Velebit – Mesolithic flint tools found in Vaganačka Cave under Veliko Rujno – date back to this era.

Approximately eight thousand years ago, the first cattle breeders and farmers arrived in the area, bringing wheat, domestic goats and sheep, as well as the knowledge of their breeding. Hunter-gathering lost its importance, and livestock-rearing began on Velebit. Plenty of material evidence, such as bones of domestic animals, tools and equipment used by prehistoric shepherds and decorated clay tableware, was found in the caves that served as shelter for people and cattle.

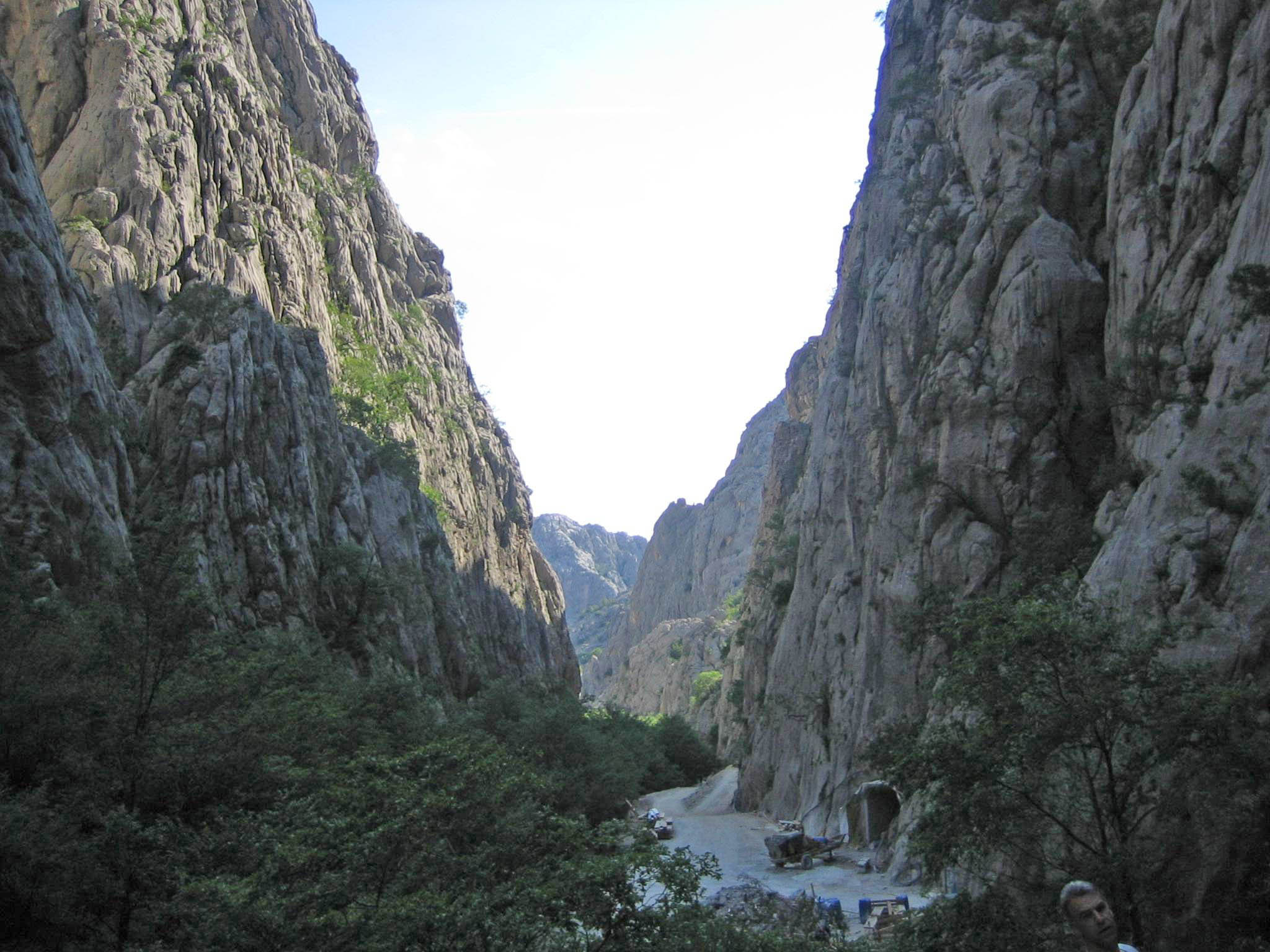
Velika Paklenica gorge

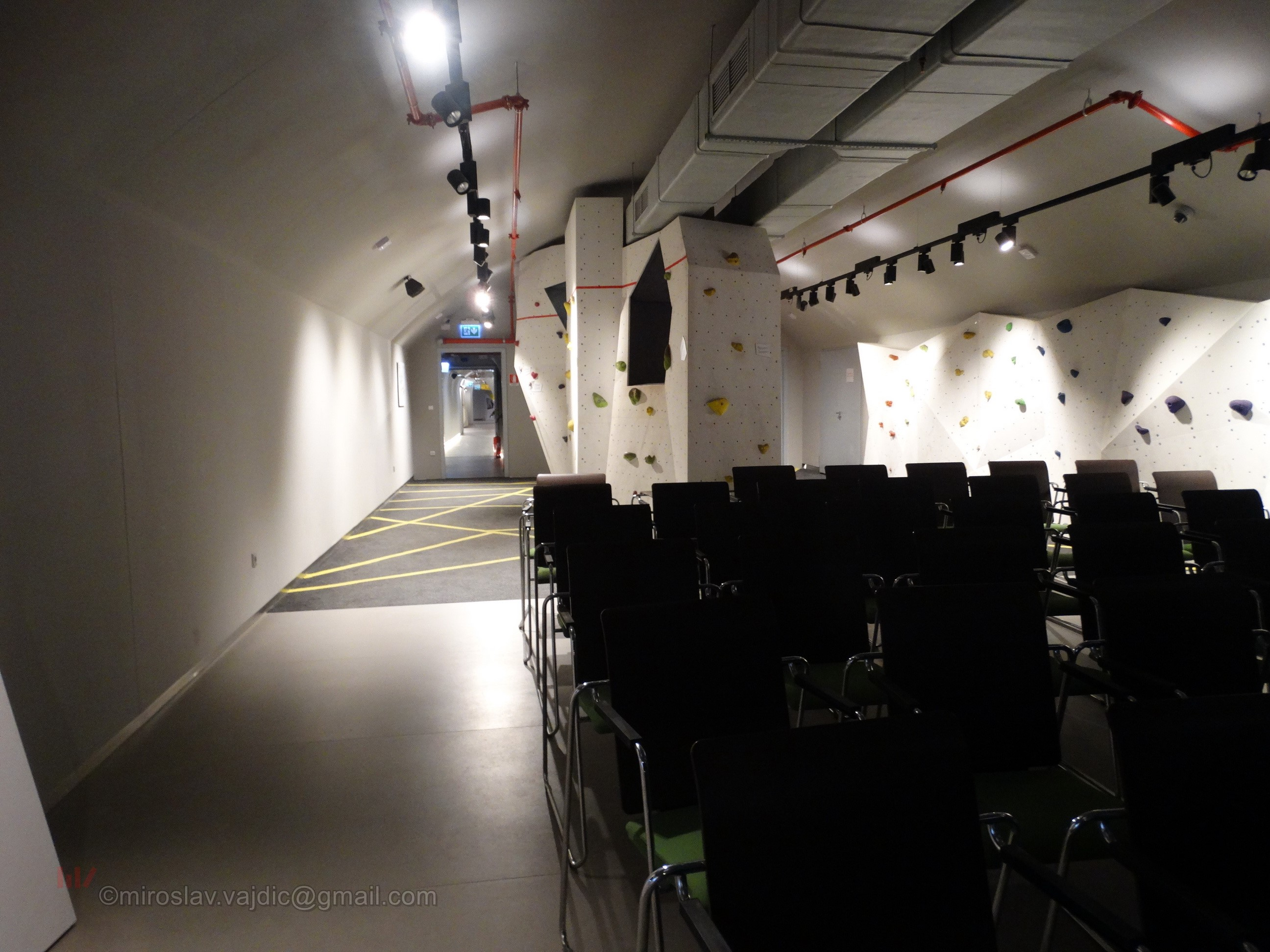
An underground military complex in Paklenica was built between 1950 and 1953, at the height of tensions between Yugoslavia and the Soviet Union, and remained a closely guarded secret until 1991. Since 2016, it is a visitor center open to the public, and dedicated to mountain climbing.

During the last two thousand years BC, during the Bronze Age, the first fortifications and stone buildings were erected by Liburian peoples. They could serve as shelter to the population from the surrounding villages in case of danger, and some of them may have been permanent settlements where the local rulers had their seats. In addition, they oversaw important cattle and trade routes leading to Velebit and further to Lika via Paklenica or Rujan. Some of them served to oversee navigation. They are now destroyed, but ring-shaped mounds ("gromila", pl. "gromile") up to several meters in height can still be seen in some places. In the immediate vicinity of the fortifications, casket heaps – deposits of large round stone under which former rulers were buried in caskets made of stone tablets – have been found. Most of them have been dug out and the graves robbed, but they are still visible, as in the area of hamlet Ljubotić in Tribanj.

Over the last two thousand years BC, the east coast of the Adriatic was gradually conquered by the Roman legions. After the Roman province of Dalmatia was founded in the early 1st century AD, permanent Roman reign was established. Starigrad (Roman name: Argyruntum) was established at the time, and it soon developed into an important trading center. In the 4th century AD, Emperor Tiberius had it fortified with walls and towers. The town cemetery was situated by the road that led southwest of the town. Plenty of archaeological findings were collected from approximately 400 explored graves – jewelry, glassware and metalware, weapons and tools. The most interesting finding is certainly the ancient glass collection – as many as 146 vessels of different forms (bowls, glasses, bottled) – kept in the Zadar Museum of Archeology.

Life in Argyruntum came to a standstill in the early 4th century AD. The era of peace was interrupted by attacks of tribal peoples that contributed to the decline of the Roman Empire in the west. In an attempt to bring the Adriatic coast back into the Empire, East Roman Emperor Justinian built a system of fortifications to secure navigation and protect the local population. The ruins of forts and towers above Modrič and near Sveta Trojica in Tribanj are parts of this defensive system that briefly postponed the final decline of the ancient world in the Adriatic.

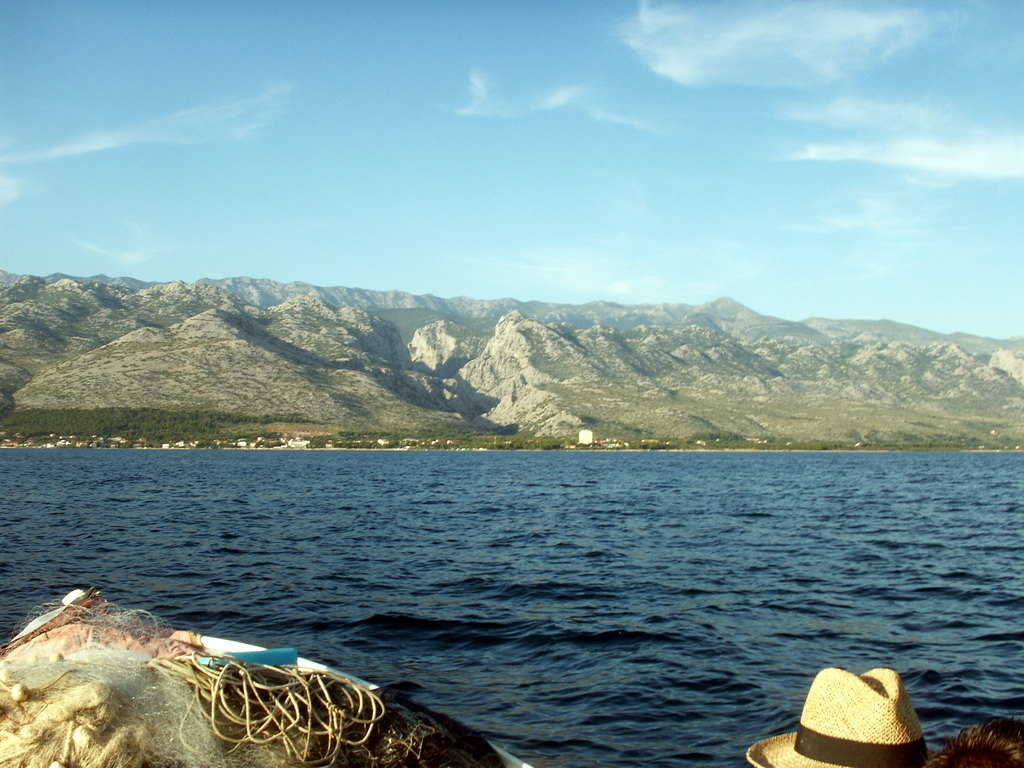
Paklenica seen from Ražanac

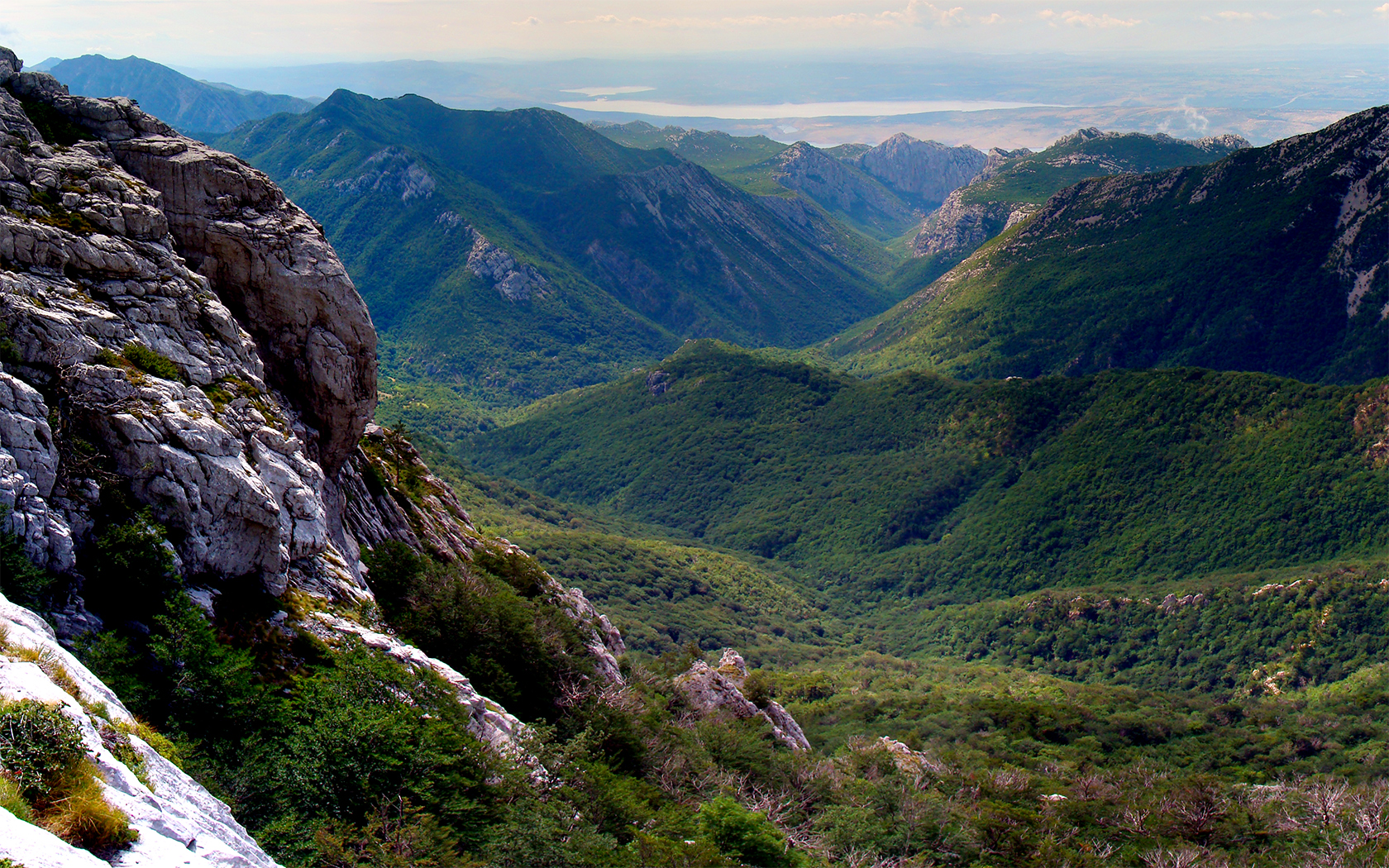
Paklenica interior

The arrival of Croats in this area began in the early Middle Ages. The earliest preserved traces of their presence are the chapels, St. George (Sv. Juraj) in Rovanjska, St. Peter (Sv. Petar) in Starigrad, and St. Mary Magdalene (Sv. Marija Magdalena or Trstenica) built from the 9th or 12th century AD. Two forts – Večka Kula and Paklarić – were probably erected in the late Middle Ages (14th–16th century).

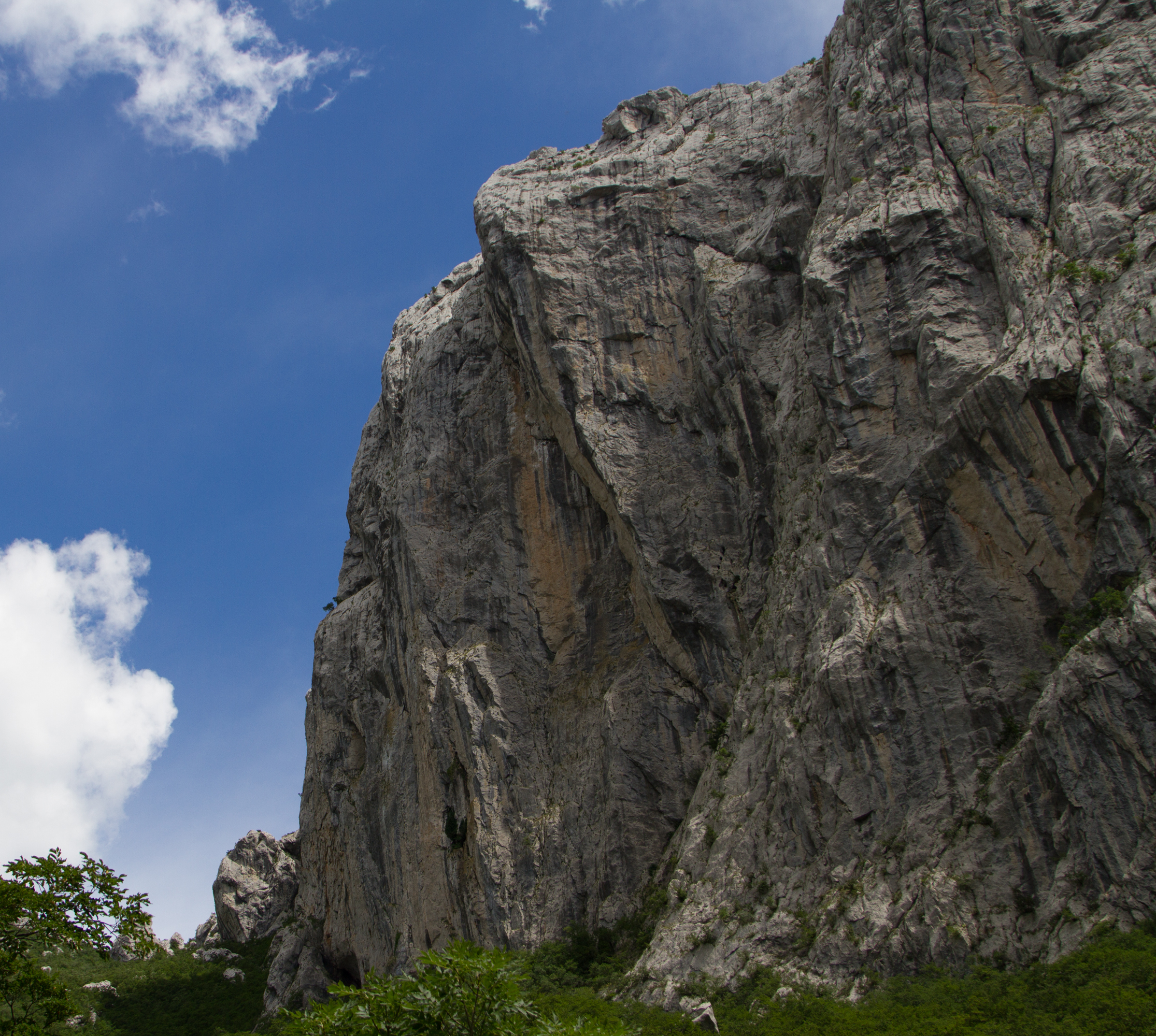
Anića kuk (712 m/2350 ft) has some of the best-known big wall routes in the canyon

On 27 June 1938, Dragutin Brahm died during an attempted ascent of Anića kuk.

In 1940, Marijan Dragman and Slavo Brezovečki successfully climbed Brahm's route up Anića kuk, naming it D. Brahm (5c).

Near the entrance to the Velika Paklenica is an artificial tunnel complex built for Josip Broz Tito during the tension between Yugoslavia and the USSR in the late 1940s and early 1950s.

Rock climbing at Paklenica resumed in 1955.

On 17 July 1957, Boris Kulić and Boris Kambič of HPD Mosor ascended Mosoraški (5c) on Anića kuk, with only ropes untied from their mothers' clothes lines and homemade pitons as protection.

The 1st Yugoslav alpine climbing gathering in Anića luka was held on Labour Day in 1959.

On 4–5 October 1961, Davor Ribarović, Nedjeljko Jakić, and Matija Mlinac of PDS Velebit ascended Velebitaški (6a+) on Anića kuk.

On 4–8 October 1966, Miroslav Pleško, Stanislav Gilić, and Nedjeljko Jakić of PDS Velebit ascended Klin (6c+) on Anića kuk. The ascent took 5 days.

From 26 April through 3 May 1973, Borislav Aleraj and Marijan Čepelak ascended the 350 metres (1,150 ft) Brid Klina (Note: Also known as Kant Haka) (7b+) on Anića kuk. The multi-pitch climb took them 8 days (then a regional record), and made national news. With an aid climbing grade of A3/A4, it was also the hardest routes in the region. Its first repeat came in 1986, by Srečo Rehberger and Tadej Slabe. It was repeated again in 1987 by Czechs P. Čermák and Z. Konečný. Other well-known repeaters include Boris Čujić and Martina Čufar Potard. (Note: Women's lead champion at the 2001 UIAA Climbing World Championships, who climbed it with a strong partner. An article about the ascent appeared in Góry (ISSN 0867-8324).) The climb to the base of the Klin is an easy 4/5. The first pitch along the Brid is a long 7b that can be separated into multiple pitches (7b, 6c+, 6b, 6a, 5c). A 6b/7a pitch follows. The next two pitches are both 7b+ and make up the crux of the route. The Klin is then abandoned for a 4c top out.

The first ascent of Šaleški smjer (4c) on Anića kuk was made by D. Kukovec and J. Resnik. At one point, Franček Knez set a speed record of 11 min on the route. Knez was very active in Paklenica in the 1970s, climbing approximately 40 routes, including some of the hardest free ascents at the time, such as Kača (6a) on Anića Kuk, which he climbed together with Jože Zupan. One time when Boris Čujić was climbing the 120 metres (390 ft) Domžalski smjer (6a), Knez was overtook him. While he was about 10 metres (33 ft) below, Knez asked Čujić, "is it going [well]?" (Serbo-Croatian: jel' ide?), to which Čujić replied it was (Serbo-Croatian: ide); Knez followed up with, "the important thing is that it is going" (Serbo-Croatian: glavno da ide), now 10 metres (33 ft) above.

The climbing school of PDS Velebit used to take place in Paklenica during the gathering. It was during one such school on the Labour Day of 1980 that Boris Čujić, later one of the canyon's most prolific first ascenders, first climbed in Paklenica. Anića luka was full of tents, as it was the 22nd Yugoslav alpine climbing gathering, and camping there was still allowed in those days. Many climbers were camping in the rock shelters along the path, as the meadow itself would fill up, sometimes with over a hundred tents. That year, the Velebitaši (Note: Members of PDS Velebit) followed Belgrade climbers up Brid Klina on Anića Kuk. Back at camp, stories of Franček Knez and Jan Sabolek's ascents took preeminence, as the best climbers in attendance.

In 1984, Silvo Karo, Janez Jeglič made the first ascent of the 350 metres (1,150 ft) long Spomin (8c) on Anića kuk, whose current route was modified with the addition of a direct exit in 1985 when joined by Franček Knez. Its first free ascent was by Luka Krajnc on 10 May 2017 after 27 days of redpointing, with Ena Vrbek as his partner. To date, no one has climbed the full overhang of the Klin; Spomin being the closest yet. Krajnc rated the most difficult pitch 8c, the second most difficult 8b+, two 8a+, and the rest of the route reaches 7b+. Later, on 10 May, Lindič would complete a free ascent of the 350 metres (1,150 ft) Mjesečina (7c+).

In 1987, Maurizio Zanolla climbed Il Maratoneta (8b+), which remains Paklenica's most difficult sport route, repeated only thrice as of 2020.

In 1989, Paklenica's most difficult aid route was climbed by Miha Praprotnik and Matjažt Ravhekar, Jogananda (7c), at the time given the grade A4.

In 1990, Yves and Claude Remy visited Paklenica, climbing Rajna (7a) and Wellcome (7b+).

In 1998, Boris Čujić and Ivica Matković renovated the climbing route equipment and bolted a number of new routes on behalf of the National Park Paklenica.

On 12 April 2009, Luka Lindič completed the first free ascent of the 240 metres (790 ft) Tango vertikal (7a+), first aid climbed by S. Karo and Silvo Karo in the mid-1980s. Karo was Lindič's partner when he climbed the route in 2009. He had just completed the first free ascent of the 250 metres (820 ft) route Življenje (7a) on the 10th, likewise with Karo as his partner.

== Geological features ==
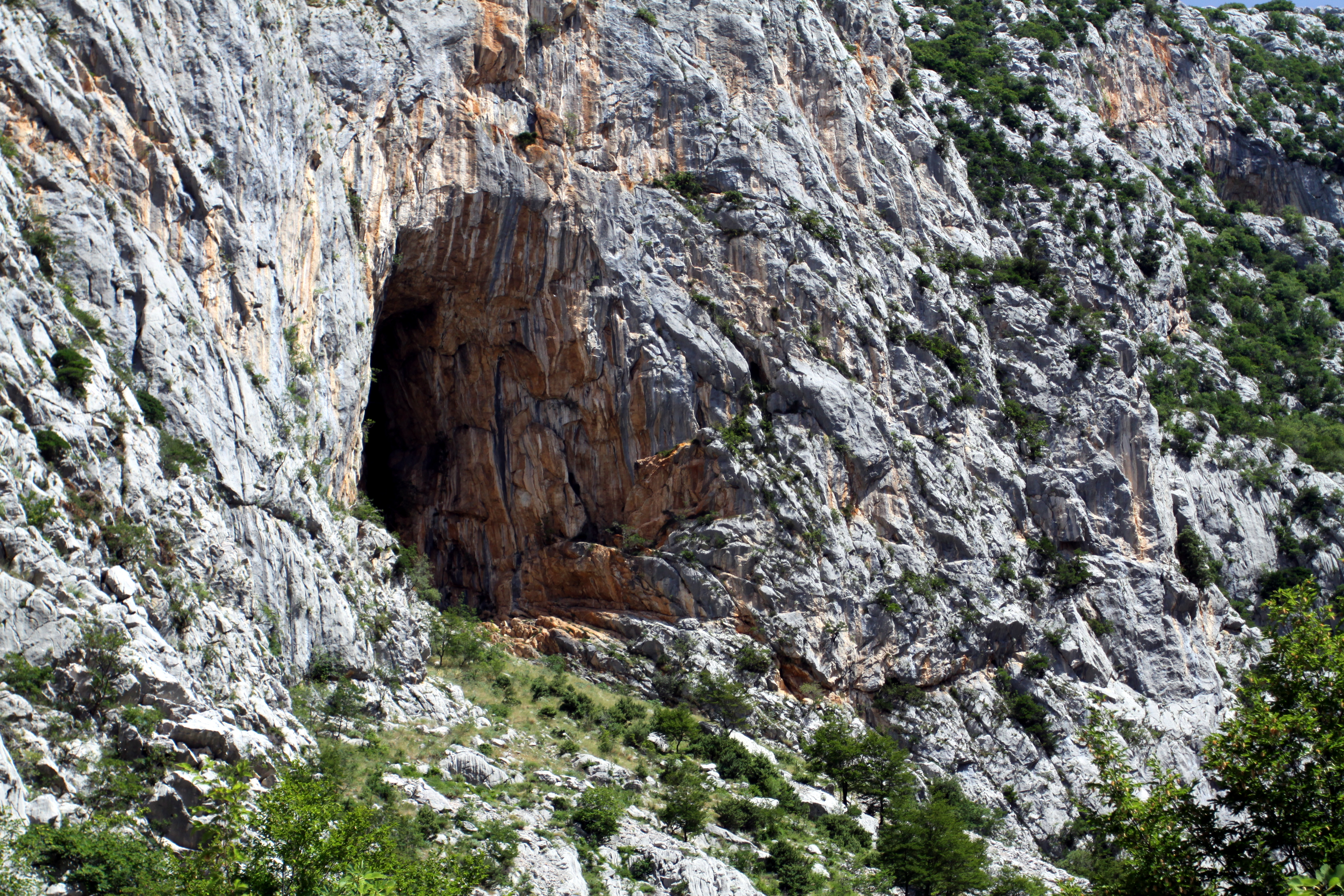
Vodarica cave in Mala Paklenica

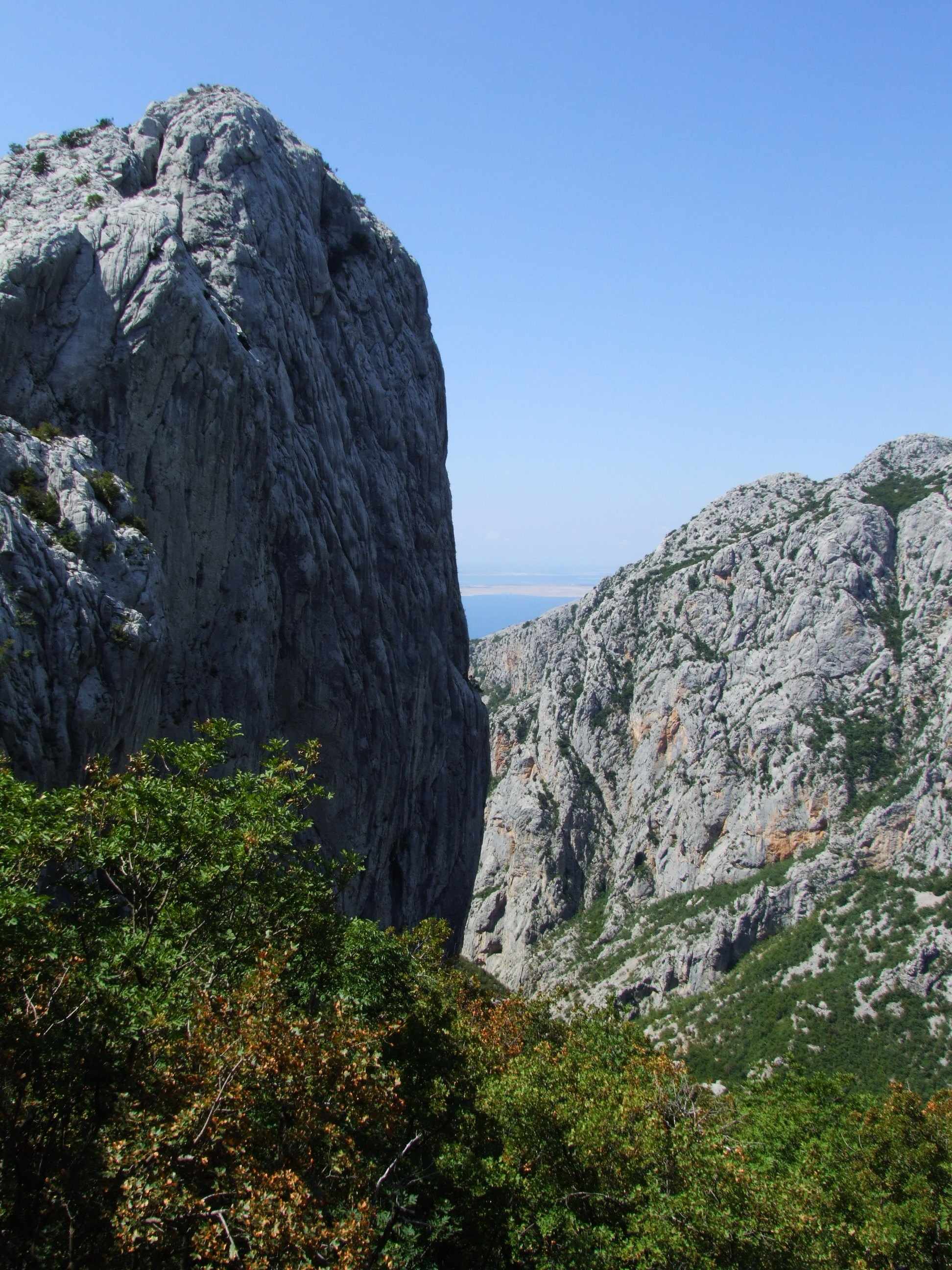

The main features of South Velebit are the canyons of Velika Paklenica and Mala Paklenica. Velika Paklenica canyon is 14 km long and 500–800 m wide. In its narrowest part around the Bunkers, the canyon is only 50 m wide. Vertical cliffs rise above both sides of the canyon up to a height of over 700 m. Downstream from Anića luka the stream drops steeply between cliffs that rise directly above it, forming the narrowest part of the canyon between Anića luka and the parking lot. Mala Paklenica Canyon is smaller, and the torrent running through it is much less powerful. It is 12 km long and 400–500 m wide. In its narrowest part, it is only 10 m wide, while the surrounding cliffs rise up to a height of 650 m.

The central part of the Park is distinctive for the relief complex of Borovnik and Crni vrh, with the valley of Mala Močila and Velika Močila nearby. In terms of relief, Velika Močila is a bowl-shaped valley at an altitude 850 m asl, surrounded by Crni vrh (1 110 m asl), Škiljina kosa (1 015 m asl) and Zeleni brig (842 m asl), while Borovnik, named after the black pine forest, stretches along the south edge.

The east part of the Park is very differentiated geomorphologically, inaccessible and wild. Further to the east, this zone of wilderness transforms into an area of milder forms around Malo Libinje and Veliko Libinje, karstic plateaus with numerous pits, the bottoms of which were mostly treated.

The highest area of Paklenica National Park is the narrow ridge of Velebit, 1 to 3 km wide. The highest peak of Velebit – Vaganski vrh (1 757 m asl) is also here. The area of Paklenica National Park is one of the most completely explored areas in Croatia in terms of speleology. 76 speleological objects are known and have been explored in the Park, namely 39 pits and 37 caves. We will mention some of the most interesting speleological objects in the National Park. Vodarica Pit is the longest cave in Velebit at 300 meters, Precipice on Bunovac (534 m) is the deepest object in Central and South Velebit.

Watertight sediments are situated beneath very porous karstic deposits of carbonate rock in the extended part of Velika paklenica, Brezimenjača, and in the spring parts of Mala paklenica and the occasional flow of Orljača. This is why Paklenica National Park has several permanent or occasional flows and many permanent springs. The permanent springs of high-quality drinking water are Stražbenica, Kontinovo vrilo, Crno vrilo, Velika Močila and Pećica.

Today there is no water flowing through Mala Paklenica.

== Flora ==
The area contains 1,000 recorded plant species and subspecies, including 79 endemic varieties. The park includes a variety of relict, endemic, rare, and legally protected species. Due to this high level of biodiversity, the park is recognized as a significant floristic area on a regional, continental, and global scale.

The forest phenomenon is one of the main reasons why the South Velebit area was proclaimed a national park. Areas of oak and oriental hornbeam forests, beech forest, black pine forests, and fern forest, can all be found in the park. In 2017, the beech forests within the national park were added to the UNESCO World Heritage Site known as Ancient and Primeval Beech Forests of the Carpathians and Other Regions of Europe because of their testimony to the ecological history of forest dynamics within Europe since the last Ice Age.

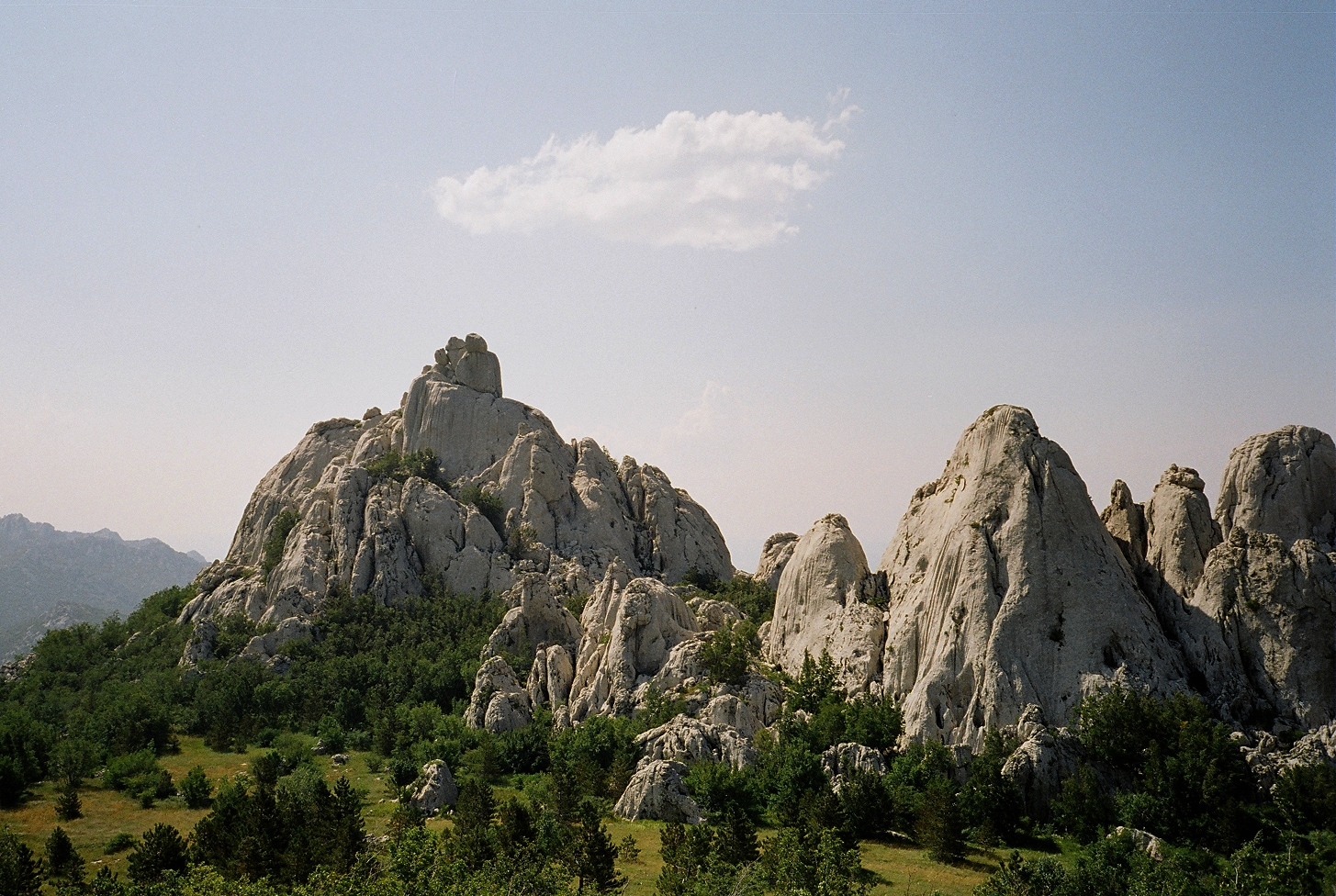

== Fauna ==
The diverse habitats in Paklenica and the vertical stratification provide home to a diverse fauna. Invertebrates are relatively poorly studied, although conspicuous insects such as diurnal butterflies are well documented. Over 40 species of amphibians and reptiles are found, the endangered Orsini's viper is a highlight.

Birds are the most numerous group of vertebrates, with 230 species recorded to date. The world of birds is represented by 102 species of nesting birds found in the broader park area. The nesting bird group includes a community of birds inhabiting rocks and cliffs in the canyons of Velika Paklenica and Mala Paklenica, with 24 bird species. A special value is added to the park by the endangered and rare bird species such as the golden eagle, peregrine falcon, short-toed eagle and goshawk. Forest areas are rich with woodpeckers, the rarest among them being the white-backed woodpecker and middle spotted woodpecker.

There are also 53 species of mammals at the park, the roe deer and chamois are highlights, while the brown bear is the biggest predator. In the caves there is a host of interesting underground animals such as crabs, mites, Nematodes, aquatic worms, spiders, pseudoscorpion, beetles and bats.

== Tourism ==
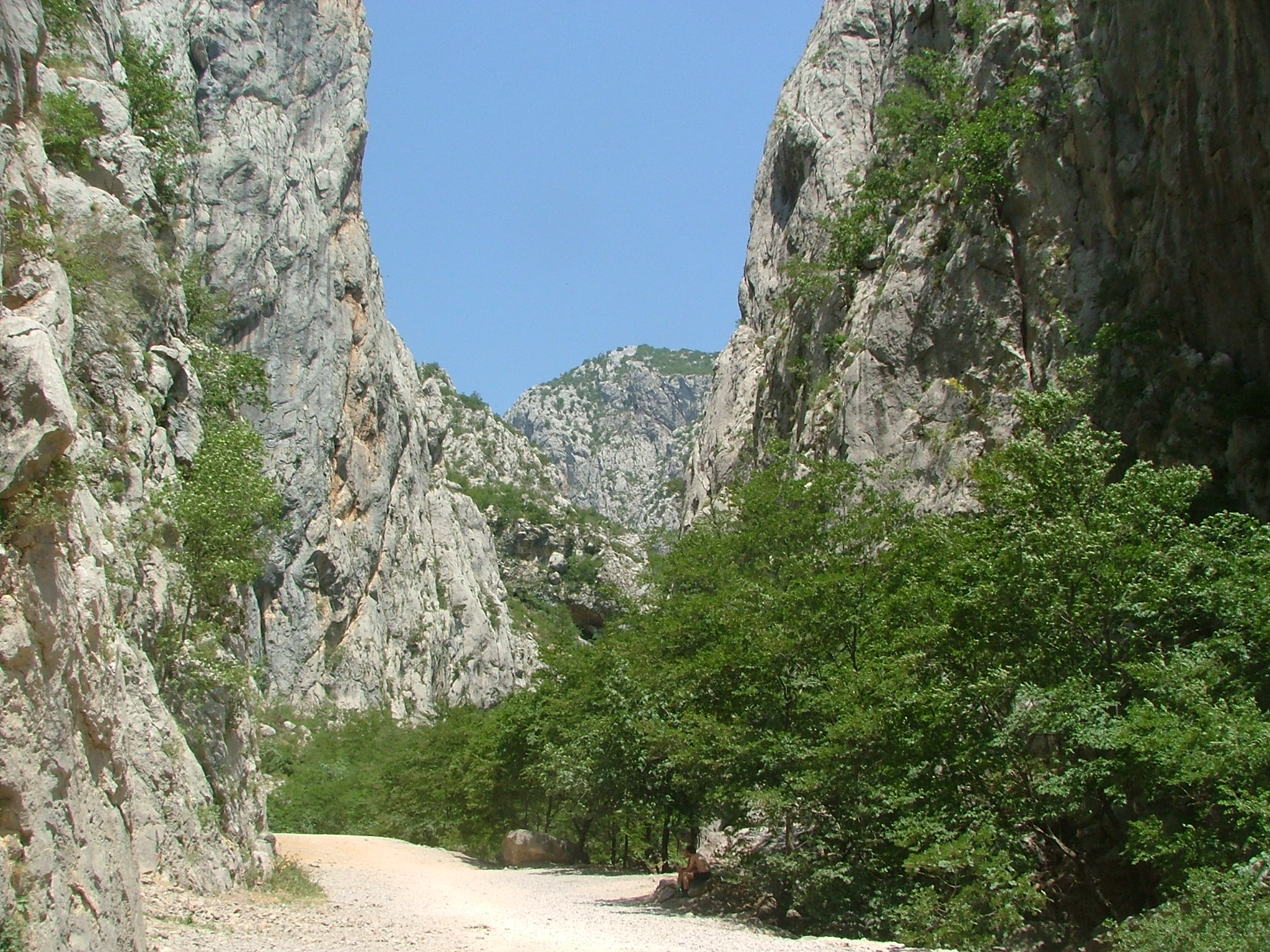
A Trail in Paklenica

Hiking is the only way to really get to know Paklenica. The Park area contains 150–200 km of trails and paths, from those intended for tourists, leading from Velika Paklenica Canyon to Manita peć cave, Lugarnica forest cottage and the mountain hut, to those intended for mountaineers, leading to the highest peaks of Velebit. The trails in the Park are marked with boards and mountaineering signs.

Paklenica National Park is the most visited climbing site in Croatia, and the largest in Southeast Europe. The close proximity of seawater gives this climbing site a special charm, making Paklenica Riviera an ideal place to combine climbing and water sports. Today, there are over 360 equipped and improved routes of various difficulty levels and lengths within Paklenica's climbing sites, so each climber can find to their liking. The main climbing season begins in spring and goes on until late autumn.

=== Mountain huts ===
In the 1935–1936 season, the mountain shelter on Struge, at 1,320 metres (4,330 ft) in elevation, saw 25 visitors. In the 1936–1937 season, no data was released, but it was open year-round, as in the 1937–1938 season.

== Bibliography ==
- Čujić, Boris (2020). Zlatne godine [Golden Years] (in Serbo-Croatian). Zagreb: Libricon. ISBN 978-953-8017-12-4.
- NPP (2020). "History of Rock Climbing in Paklenica". Nacionalni park Paklenica. Archived from the original on 2020-09-22.
- Mikša, Peter (2017-09-02). "Luka Krajnc opravil 1. prosto ponovitev smeri Spomin (8c) v Paklenici". Friko: Slovenski plezalni portal. Archived from the original on 2017-09-05.
- Krajnc, Luka (2017-08-30). "The Memory Lessons: Luca Krajnc's First Free Ascent of Spomin". Patagonia. Archived from the original on 2020-08-12.
- AOC (2017). "Spomin: Luka Krajnc". Alpinistični odsek Celje. Archived from the original on 2025-08-27.
- Čujić, Boris (2016). "The short history of climbing in Paklenica". Paklenica-Croatia. Archived from the original on 2016-06-14.
- Urednik (2009-05-13). "Psihaška vijest..." SPK Marulianus. Archived from the original on 2025-08-27.
- AOC (2009c). "Mjesečina: Luka Lindič". Alpinistični odsek Celje. Archived from the original on 2010-06-20.
- AOC (2009b). "Tango vertikal: Luka Lindič". Alpinistični odsek Celje. Archived from the original on 2020-08-06.
- AOC (2009a). "Življenje: Luka Lindič". Alpinistični odsek Celje. Archived from the original on 2025-08-27.
- Marcisz, Andrzej (2008-10-29). "Brid Klina – perła Adriatyku na Anica Kuk". Wspinanie (in Polish). Archived from the original on 2025-07-11.
- Čujić, Boris (2001). "Paklenica". Croatia: Penjački vodič [Croatia: Climbing guide] (in Serbo-Croatian) (4th ed.). Zagreb: Astroida. pp. 148–190. ISBN 953-97271-7-0.
- Poljak, Željko (February 1959). "Paklenica". Kazalo za "Hrvatski planinar" i "Naše planine" 1898—1958 (PDF). Vol. XI. p. 16. ISSN 0354-0650.
