= Tribanj =

- Village
- Location of Tribanj within Croatia
- Coordinates: 44°20′58″N 15°18′58″E
- Country: Croatia
- County: Zadar

Area
  - Total: 52.0 km^{2} (20.1 sq mi)
  - Land: 51.73 km^{2} (19.97 sq mi)

Population (2021)
  - Total: 232
  - Density: 4.48/km^{2} (11.6/sq mi)
- Time zone: UTC+1 (CET)
  - Summer (DST): UTC+2 (CEST)
- Postal code: 23244
- Area code: 023

Tribanj is a village in the municipality of Starigrad, Zadar County, north Dalmatia. The village consists of seven hamlets: Kozjača, Kruščica, Lisarica, Ljubotić, Običaj, Sveta Marija Magdalena, and Šibuljina. In a geopolitical context, Tribanj was the border of Austrian Kingdom of Dalmatia in the 19th century, and is still viewed as a cultural border between Dalmatia and Croatian Littoral. It is situated on the southern slopes of Velebit mountain, also known as Podgorje.

== Name ==
Its Italian name is Tribagno.

== Geography ==
Tribanj has a long coastline (around 10 km long), which is a part of the Paklenica riviera. The coastline has been described already in the beginning of the 17th century in the Senj pilot, together with short details on its small ports and presence of water and wood. Along the coast, especially after heavy rainfall in Lika region, appearance of vruljas can be seen. Climatically, Tribanj has a temperate humid climate with hot summers (Cfa). During winter months, bura has a great impact on life in Podgorje region, usually with roads being closed for traffic (Karlobag – Sv. Marija Magdalena part of D8 state road, especially). The vegetation in Tribanj spans from sub-mediterranean zones of downy oak (Quercus pubescens) and European hop-hornbeam (Ostrya carpinifolia) in the littoral to zones of Dinaric forests of common beech (Fagus sylvatica) and silver fir (Abies alba) higher up in Velebit.

== History ==
=== Prehistory and ancient history ===
Area of Tribanj has an evident history of human activity since the Mesolithic. The earliest evidence of human presence are found in caves, such as Reljina pećina, a cave near Ljubotić. Arrival of Liburnians during the Iron Age saw the abandonment of caves as primary settlements. Instead, the Liburnians introduced building fortified hillforts and burying their deceased in tumuli. The hillforts, known as gradina or gomila, which are in local population known as turski grobovi (lit. Turkish graves). Trošeljeva gradina, gradina above Lisarica, Silna (Sirna) gomila, and gradina sveta Trojica (Tribnjina) are the most prominent examples. The hillfort Tribnjina stands at 330 metres above sea level, and thus dominates the surrounding area. The ancient settlement was protected on the west side by a gorge (Tribanjska draga), and by defensive walls on the north, east, and south side. Prior the Roman conquest of the east Adriatic coast, Tribnjina was probably the major centre of south Velebit area. The Roman conquest saw the formation of Argyruntum and its development as civitas, thus lessening the significance of Tribnjina. During the reign of Justinian I, a fortification (castrum) was built below the Liburnian hillfort of Tribnjina.

=== Middle ages ===
The first mention of toponym Tribanj was in 1205.

=== Modern history ===
Dalmatia was promised to the Kingdom of Italy by the Treaty of London (1915) with its northern land borders that included Lisarica and Tribanj, listed as two different villages in the Treaty under Article 5.

== Demographics ==
According to the census from 1900, Tribanj was the 3rd most populated settlement in the Podgorje area, with 1160 inhabitants, only the city of Senj (pop. 3182) and the village of Stinica (pop. 1345) were more populated. The population declined heavily since then in almost the whole Podgorje area, with similar trends on Croatian coast seen only on some islands. Such a decline of populace in Podgorje has to do with the wars that took place since then, the steep mountainous area, karst topography and climatic factors (e.g. bura wind, which causes the section of the D8 state road to close several times a year). These factors lead to subsequent lack of sufficient infrastructure and traversal of traffic to highways. The exception for depopulation in Podgorje are only seen in Starigrad and Senj. The 2011 census saw 267 inhabitants, while the 1991 census listed 481 inhabitants; 69.23% Croats and 25.57% Serbs. Families that are indigenous to Tribanj are Babac, Gazić, Lukić, Marinković, Matak, Njegovan, Poljak, Prodan, Sjauš, Štrbo, Trošelj, Vukić, Zubčić, Žeželj.

=== Religion ===
The village has a Serbian Orthodox church (dedicated to Archangel Michael), built in 1865, a Serbian Orthodox chapel on the cemetery (dedicated to the Holy Trinity), built in 1830, and a Roman Catholic church (dedicated to Mary Magdalene), built in 1181.
