= Marijan Dragman =

Croatian boxer, and alpinist

- Born: April 24, 1910; Zagreb, Austria-Hungary (now Croatia)
- Died: 1945
- Children: Darije (son); Ksenija (daughter)
- Relatives: August Dragman (father); Marija Dragman (mother)

Marijan Dragman (April 24, 1910 – 1945) was a Croatian alpinist, photographer, sportsman, and painter.

Dragman was born in Zagreb to parents August and Marija. He became a member of the Croatian Mountaineering Association (Hrvatski planinarski savez, HPD) in 1920 at the age of 10. In 1936, the alpinist section was formed in HPD and within it a rescuing crew, which Dragman was part of. Dragman gave lectures about hiking, using his own photos. These photos had enough artistic value to receive several awards. He also took an interest in painting.

During his life, he practiced wrestling and boxing, and in 1935, he became the Croatian boxing champion in the light heavyweight category. During World War II, he collaborated with the partisans starting in 1941. In 1945, he was arrested and killed in the wagon on his way from Lepoglava prison to Jasenovac concentration camp. Despite that fact, he was falsely listed as a victim of Jasenovac by communist authorities. Additionally, on the list of the victims it is falsely claimed that he was already dead in 1944. He was survived by his wife, his son Darije, born in 1940, and his daughter Ksenija, born in 1943.

Several mountain roads and a street in Zagreb are named after him.

On the second anniversary of the death of Dragutin Brahm, who died while trying to climb Anića Kuk (712 m), Marijan Dragman and Drago Brezovečki became the first to successfully climb the rock, and the route was named after Brahm.
