= Starigrad, Zadar County =

Municipality in Croatia

Starigrad
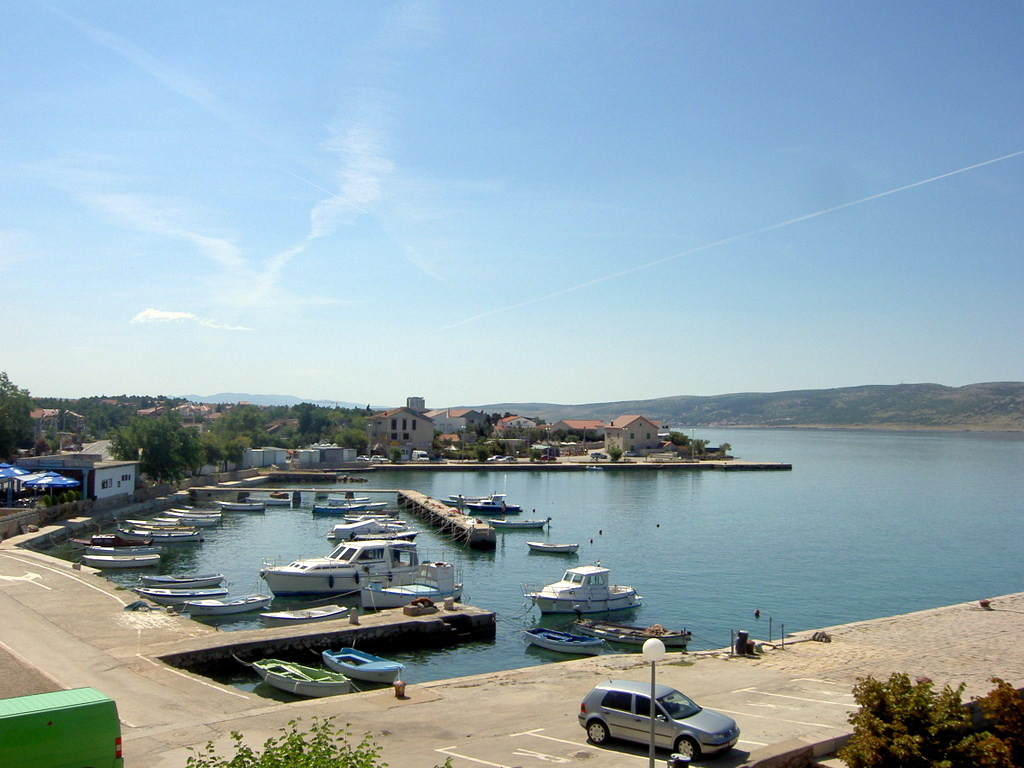
- Starigrad Harbour
- Interactive map of Starigrad
- location of Starigrad in Croatia
- Coordinates: 44°17′43″N 15°26′17″E
- Country: Croatia
- County: Zadar County

Area
  - Total: 168.7 km^{2} (65.1 sq mi)

Population (2021)
  - Total: 1,697
  - Density: 10.06/km^{2} (26.05/sq mi)
- Time zone: UTC+1 (CET)
  - Summer (DST): UTC+2 (CEST)
- Website: opcina-starigrad.hr

Starigrad (Note: Italian: Ortopula) is a municipality in the Zadar County in Croatia.

== History ==
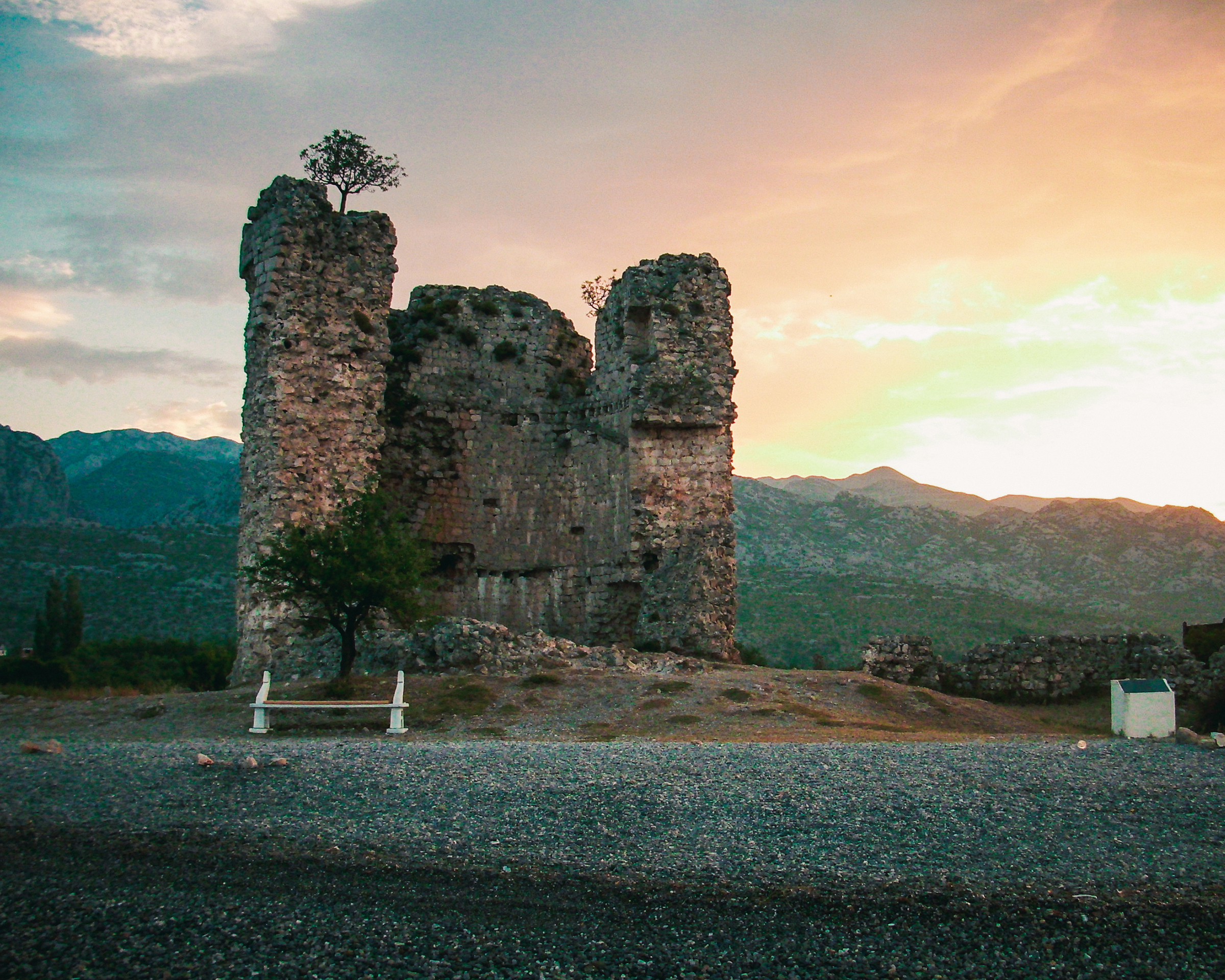
Večka kula

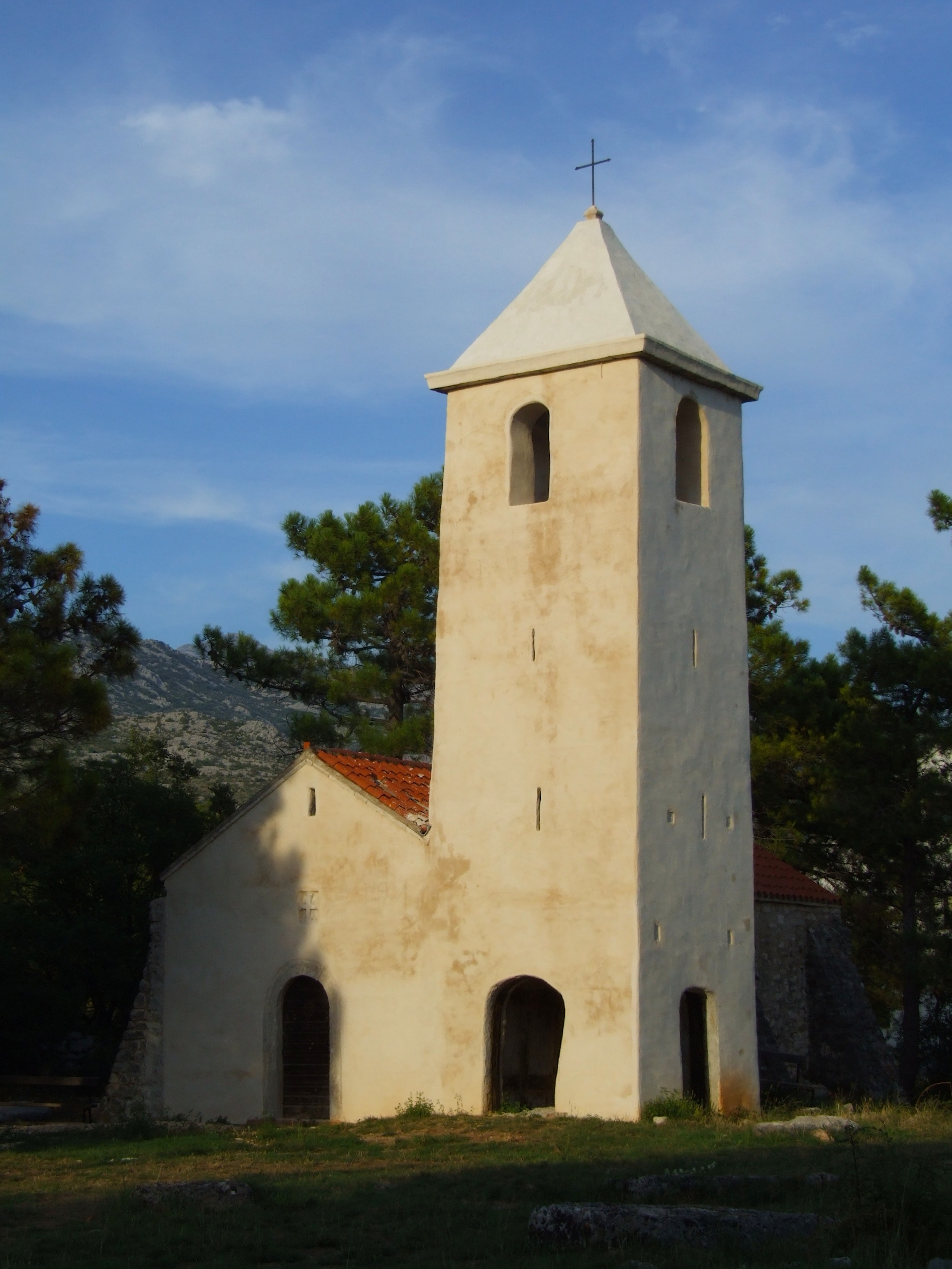
St. Peter Chapel

The Roman settlement of Argyruntum was on a 3.4-acre (14,000 m^{2}), now silted, island in the area east of the port. Emperor Tiberius erected protective walls and towers. Findings from about four hundred tombs are an evidence of great prosperity and trade relations in the Mediterranean. The oldest relic in the vicinity of Starigrad is the St. George Chapel in Rovanjska and St. Peter's Chapel in Starigrad from the ninth or tenth century. Many mediaeval ruins are present in the area, such as the Večka tower, which was the mediaeval Harbormasters' office, located on a peninsula east of Starigrad, and the fortress of Paklarić, which stands on the site of an ancient fort, on the eastern side of the entrance to the Velika Paklenica canyon.

== Population ==
In 2021, the municipality had 1,697 residents in the following 3 settlements:

- Seline, population 414
- Starigrad Paklenica, population 1,051
- Tribanj, population 232
Municipality of Starigrad: Population trends 1857–2021
v

population	1549	1758	2030	2413	2809	3165	3475	3358	2603	2528	2405	2361	2107	2097	1893	1876	1697
	1857	1869	1880	1890	1900	1910	1921	1931	1948	1953	1961	1971	1981	1991	2001	2011	2021

Sources: Croatian Bureau of Statistics publications
Village of Starigrad Paklenica: Population trends 1857–2021
v

population	511	550	640	777	912	1091	1157	1300	991	1092	1109	1163	1135	1159	1100	1140	1051
	1857	1869	1880	1890	1900	1910	1921	1931	1948	1953	1961	1971	1981	1991	2001	2011	2021

Sources: Croatian Bureau of Statistics publications

According to the 2011 census, 96% of the population were Croats.

== Climate ==
For the period 1992–2019, the highest temperature recorded at the local weather station was 42.7 °C (108.9 °F), on 10 August 2017. The coldest temperature was −9.8 °C (14.4 °F), on 27 December 1996.

== Sports ==
The local chapter of the HPS is HPD "Paklenica", which had 14 members in 1936 under the don Ante Adžija presidency. That year, a path from Anića Kuk to the entrance of Manita Peć was planned, along with the construction of a water pipeline to Starigrad. Membership rose to 20 in 1937, staying the same in 1938, the year the subterranean path in Manita Peć and the path to the cave were completed.

The HPD "Gromovača" in Starigrad was liquidated on 16 November 1935.

== Bibliography ==
- Modrić, Oliver (2025-01-27). "Prijenos i zbrinjavanje gradiva župnih arhiva u Arhiv Zadarske nadbiskupije" [Transfer and storage of materials of the parish archives to the Archives of the Archdiocese of Zadar]. Vjesnik dalmatinskih arhiva (in Serbo-Croatian). 5: 109–124. doi:10.58565/vda.5.1.5. eISSN 2806-8459.
