= Veliko Rujno =

Plateau in Croatia

Coordinates: 44°21′25″N 15°25′16″E

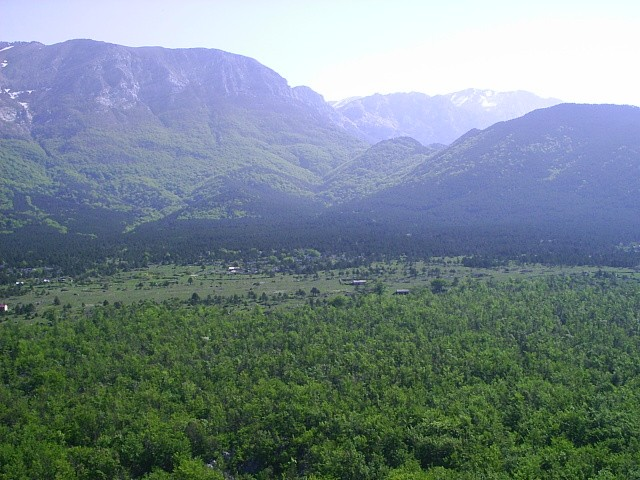
The Veliko Rujno plateau and the main ridge of Velebit

Veliko Rujno is a mountain plateau on Velebit, though to be the single biggest karst field on the mountain range, situated around 900 m above sea level.

== Description ==
The plateau hosts a prehistoric continental trail that connected the Croatian Littoral with Lika, as well as two speleological sites: the Samograd cave and the cave at Bojinac.

The plateau also hosts several gords (gradina), discovered by their dry stone foundations and the details of what seem to have been wooden constructions similar to those of prehistoric houses on the Croatian coast. Hearths and pottery sherds were discovered in the houses themselves, dating back to the late bronze age. It is believed that the site used to function as a marketplace in the bronze and the Iron Age.

It was the site of the first documented appearance of Sericoda quadripunctata in Croatia, in 2009.

In 1930, a pre-Romanesque church was built on Veliko Rujno by don Ante Adžija in place of an older, dry stone church.

== Bibliography ==
- Faber, Aleksandra (2000-10-02). "ŽIVOT NA VELEBITSKOJ VISORAVNI U PRETPOVIJESNO DOBA Veliko Rujno". Senjski zbornik: Prilozi za geografiju, etnologiju, gospodarstvo, povijest i kulturu (in Croatian). 27: 15–44 – via Hrčak.
- Dubolnić, Martina (2006-09-05). "Prapovijesna nalazišta na području Starigrada Paklenice". Radovi Zavoda za povijesne znanosti HAZU u Zadru (in Croatian). 48: 1–55 – via Hrčak.
