= Franjo Tuđman Bridge =

Franjo Tuđman Bridge may refer to:

- Franjo Tuđman Bridge (Čapljina)
- Franjo Tuđman Bridge (Dubrovnik)
- Franjo Tuđman Bridge (Osijek)
