= D420 road =

Road in Croatia

D420 state road

Route information
- Length: 2.8 km (1.7 mi)

Major junctions
- From: D8 in Dubrovnik
- To: Port of Gruž

Location
- Country: Croatia
- Counties: Dubrovnik-Neretva
- Major cities: Dubrovnik

Highway system
- Highways in Croatia

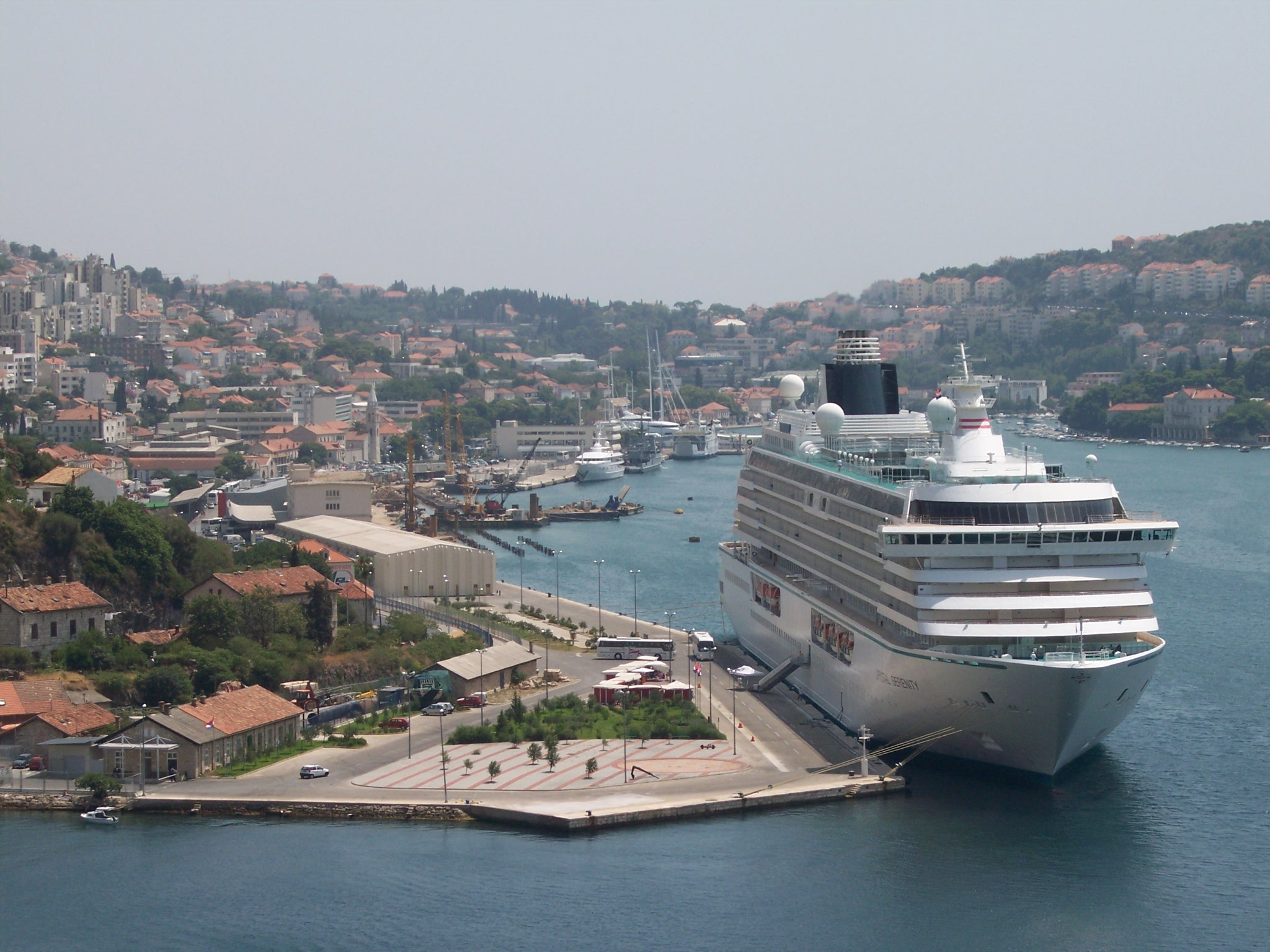
Port of Gruž in Dubrovnik, at the southern terminus of the D420 road

D420 is a state road in the northern outskirts of the city of Dubrovnik, Croatia, connecting the Port of Gruž to the D8 state road. The road is 2.8 km (1.7 mi) long.

The road, as well as all other state roads in Croatia, is managed and maintained by Hrvatske Ceste, state owned company.

== Road junctions and populated areas ==
D420 junctions/populated areas
Type	Slip roads/Notes
	Dubrovnik; D8 to Slano (to the west) and to Dubrovnik and Brgat border crossing to Trebinje, Bosnia and Herzegovina via D223 state road. Ž6254 to Komolac, Mokošica and Lozica (D8). The northern terminus of the road.
	Port of Gruž; The southern terminus of the road.
