= D8 road (Croatia) =

Road in Croatia

D8 state road

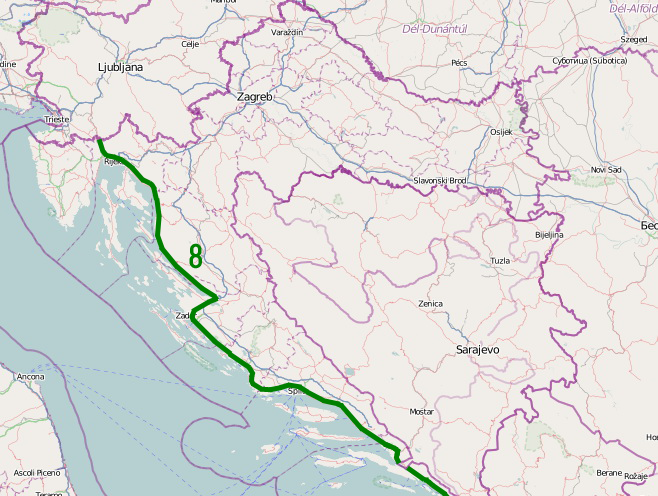

Route information
- Part of
- Length: 643.1 km (399.6 mi)

Major junctions
- From: Slovenian G7 road at Pasjak border crossing
- A7 in Rupa and Jurdani interchanges A8 in Opatija junction D40 near Bakar D23 in Senj; A1 in Maslenica and Posedarje interchanges D1 in Split D413 and D513 in Ploče D9 in Opuzen D223 near Dubrovnik
- To: M-1 Montenegrin M-1 road at Karasovići border crossing

Location
- Country: Croatia
- Counties: Primorje-Gorski Kotar, Lika-Senj, Zadar, Šibenik-Knin, Split-Dalmatia, Dubrovnik-Neretva
- Major cities: Rijeka, Senj, Zadar, Šibenik, Trogir, Split, Makarska, Ploče, Dubrovnik

Highway system
- Highways in Croatia

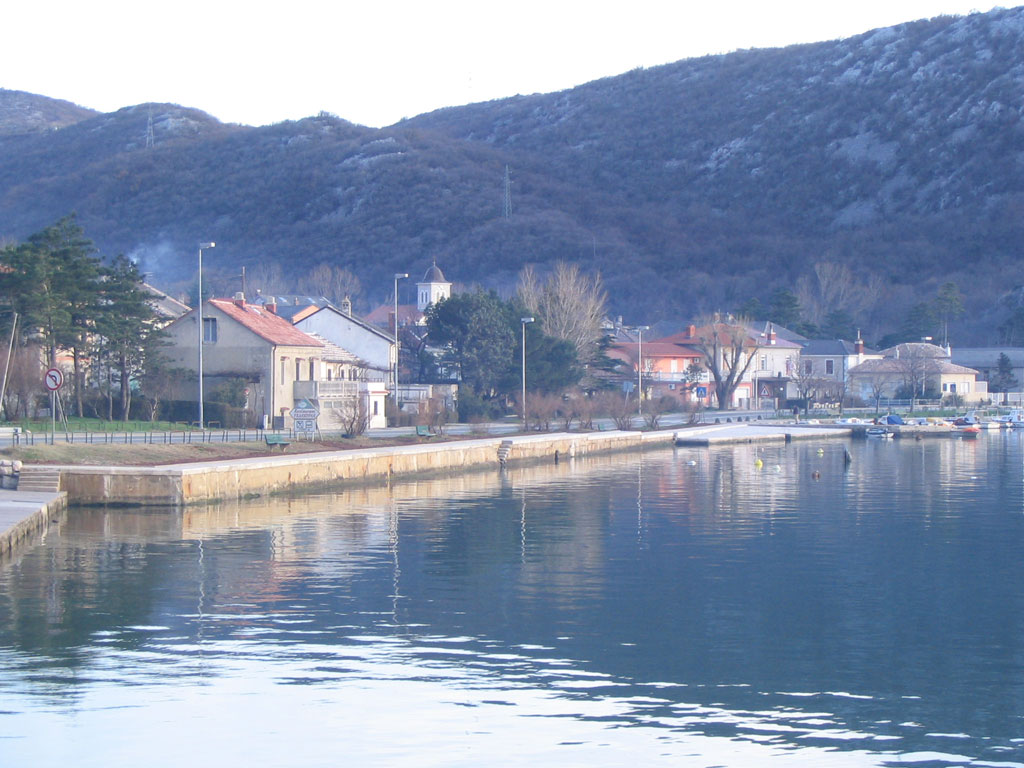
D8 state road in Bakarac running along the coastline

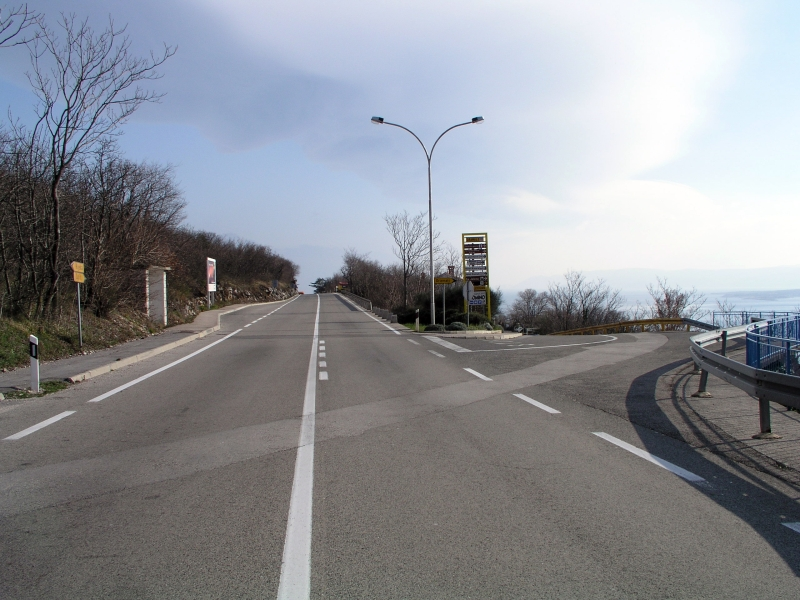
D8 state road near Dramalj

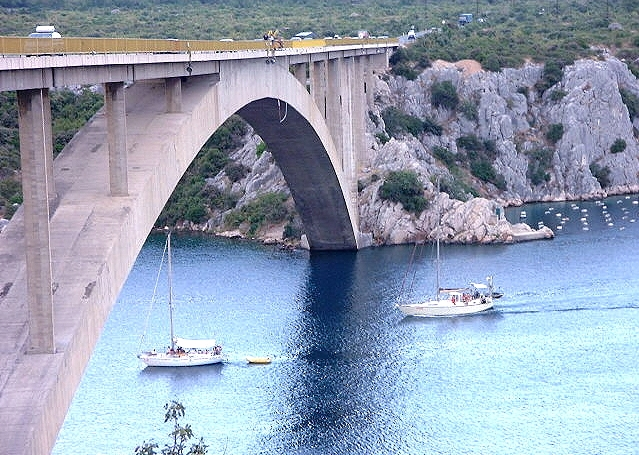
Šibenik Bridge carrying D8 state road

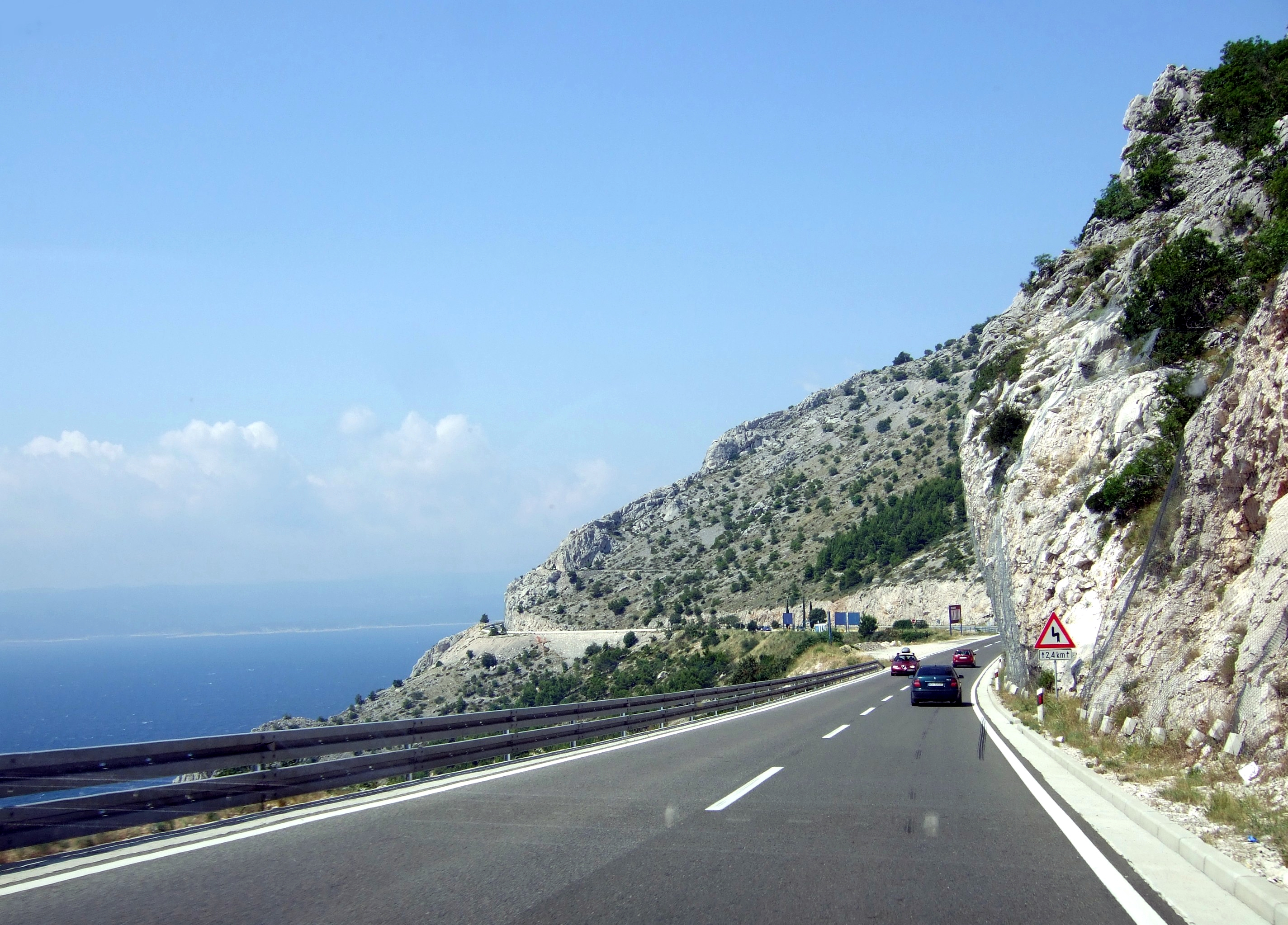
D8 state road between Makarska and Omiš

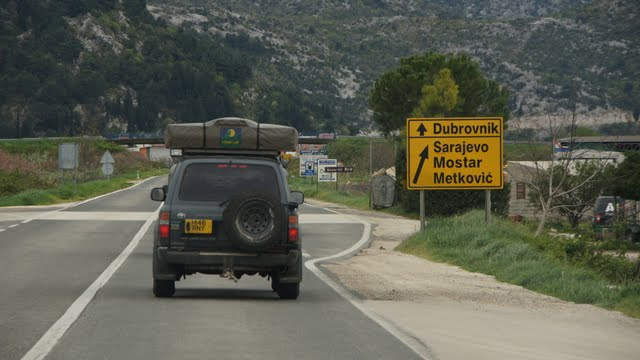
The intersection of state roads D8 and D9

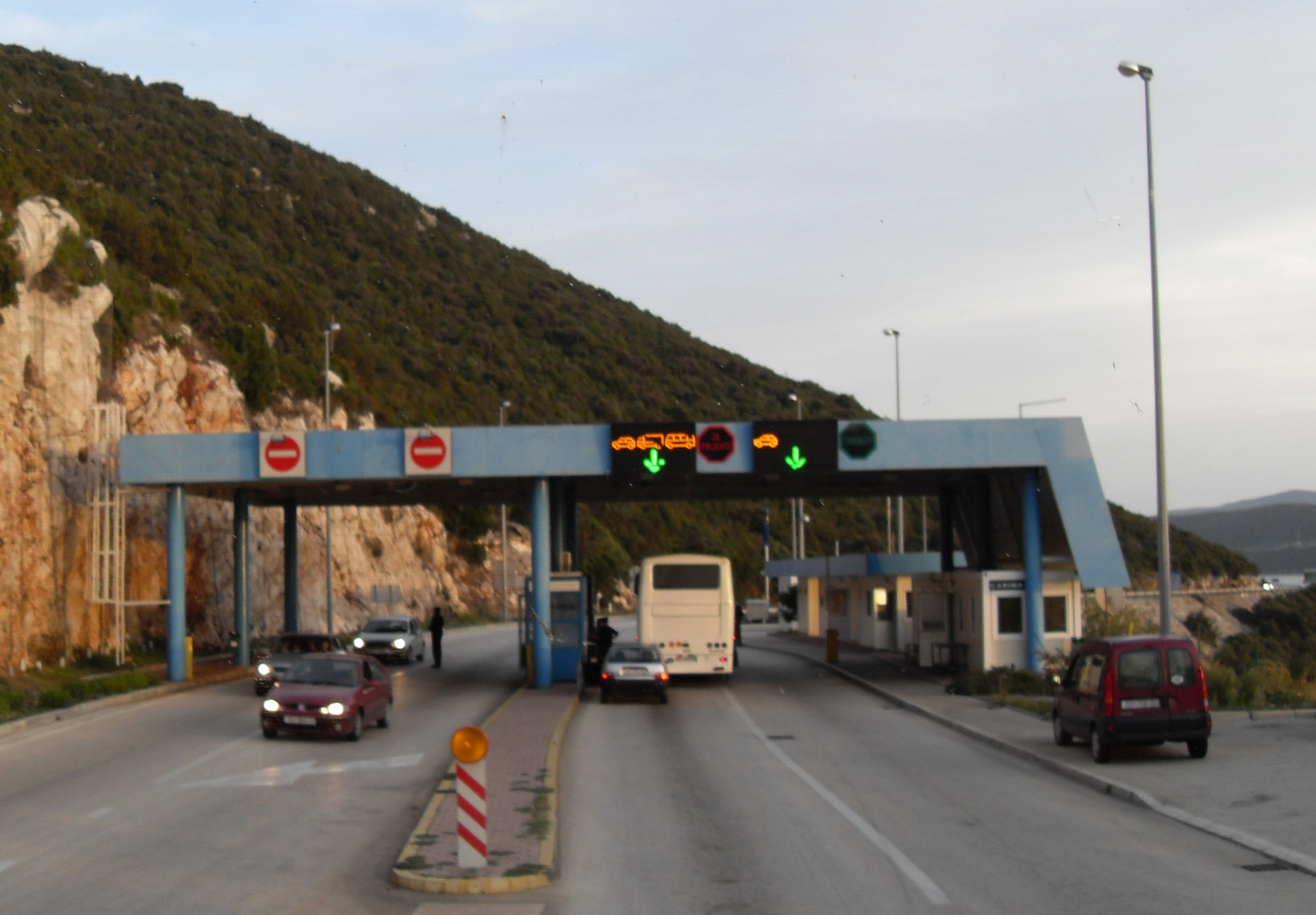
Klek border crossing

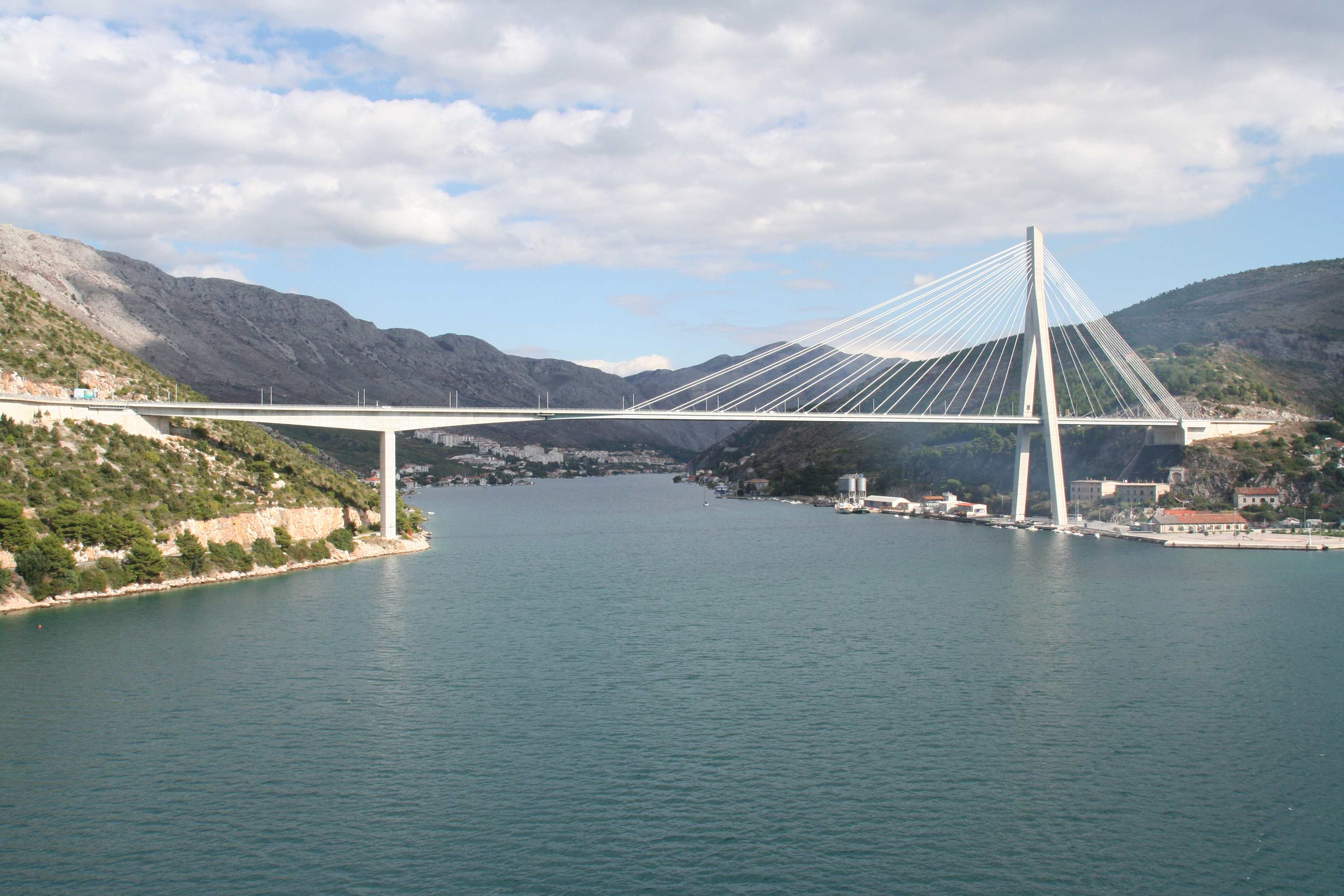
Franjo Tuđman Bridge near Dubrovnik

The D8 state road is the Croatian section of the Adriatic Highway, running from the Slovenian border at Pasjak via Rijeka, Senj, Zadar, Šibenik, Split, Opuzen, and Dubrovnik to the border with Montenegro at Karasovići. Most of the D8 state road remains single carriageway, though with some dual carriageway stretches. The total length of the road through Croatia is 643.1 kilometres (399.6 mi).

Until recently, the road was the primary route connecting the Adriatic coastal parts of Croatia. Since the 2000s, multilane motorways have taken over most of its traffic, and yet more motorways are still being built along the coast. The motorways parallel to the road are the A7 (Rupa border crossing – Rijeka – Sveti Kuzam), A6 (Rijeka – Bosiljevo) and A1 (Zagreb – Bosiljevo – Zadar – Split – Ploče), sections of the proposed Adriatic–Ionian motorway. Since the D8 closely follows the well-indented Croatian coastline, travel is considerably longer and less safe compared to the motorways because of numerous blind curves and at-grade intersections. The D8 is still popular as an alternative to the tolled motorways, so the road carries fairly constant traffic during most of the year. The traffic intensifies in the summer, because of substantial traffic to tourist destinations.

The section from Rijeka to Senj experiences heavy traffic in particular because many motorists are unwilling to take the longer route along A6 and A1. This problem used to be exacerbated before 2009 when A6 still had slow semi-highway parts on the Rijeka–Bosiljevo route. This section will remain congested at peak times until eventual completion of the A7 motorway between Rupa and Žuta Lokva.

Since the parallel A1 motorway ends near Ploče, southbound A1 traffic generally switches to the D8 state road.

Originally, the D8 road terminated 30 km (20 mi) after Ploče, at the Klek border crossing to Bosnia and Herzegovina, as the Adriatic Highway route runs across a tiny strip of Bosnia and Herzegovina territory around the town of Neum, and then resumed after reentering Croatia at Zaton Doli border crossing.

Following the building of the Pelješac Bridge in July 2022, and the Ston bypass in April 2023, the D8 was rerouted and it no longer goes to Bosnia and Herzegovina, but goes across the bridge, adding 4 kilometers to the length. The section from the northern entrance of the bridge to the border crossing at Klek is now renumbered D236, and the section from the southern bridge entrance road (and Ston bypass) to the Zaton Doli border crossing is now renumbered D237. The opening of the Ston bypass allowed buses, heavy trucks, and trucks carrying hazardous materials to use the bridge.

In Komarna, at the Duboka interchange, the road becomes an expressway as it enters the Pelješac bridge, the old D8 going to the border is now D236. Since the bridge section is an expressway, pedestrians, bicycles and mopeds are not allowed on it and are still required to go through Bosnia and Herzegovina. The bridge crosses to the Pelješac peninsula at Brijesta, where 2 km (1.2 mi) down the expressway comes the Brijesta interchange. 7 km (4.3 mi) from Brijesta, the road crosses with the old D414 at Zaradeže interchange (the section going to Zaton Doli has since been demoted to county road). 12 km (7.5 mi) from Zaradeže, the road crosses with D416 at Prapratno interchange. 7 km (4.3 mi) from Prapratno, the road rejoins the old D8 (the section to the border now bearing the designation D237) and the expressway status ends, as the road continues running to Dubrovnik along the coastline. East of Dubrovnik the road passes by Dubrovnik Airport and reaches the border with Montenegro at the Karasovići border crossing.

The D8 is the longest state road in Croatia at 643.1 km (399.6 mi). Following the rerouting over the Pelješac bridge, the length extended by 4.5 km (2.8 mi).

The road, as well as all other state roads in Croatia, is managed and maintained by Hrvatske ceste, a state-owned company.

== Traffic volume ==
Traffic is regularly counted and reported by Hrvatske Ceste. Significant variations between annual (AADT) and summer (ASDT) traffic volumes are attributed to the fact that the road carries substantial tourist traffic.

Traffic volume on the D8 state road varies greatly, as the road runs through areas of more or less developed tourist industry. Furthermore, the road runs through or near a number of major Croatian cities, such as Rijeka, Zadar and Split, which add to the traffic volume significantly. Thus, the most congested section of the D8 state road is in the city of Split, between Solin and Stobreč, where the greatest AADT figures are regularly recorded, far exceeding comparable figures of the busiest motorway sections in Croatia. Conversely, the lowest traffic volume on the D8 road is observed near Karlobag due to comparatively less developed tourism and the absence of major cities in the area. The AADT recorded on the D8 road observed in Split (Solin and Stobreč) is nearly 50 times greater than in Karlobag.

D8 traffic volume
AADT and ASDT figures by individual counting sites
Counting site	AADT	ASDT	Notes
2801 Pasjak	5,136	9,690	Adjacent to A7 motorway Pasjak interchange. Average daily traffic figure is provided instead of AADT.
2804 Mučići	5,619	6,465	Adjacent to the Ž5016 junction.
2809 Pavlovac	6,135	7,604	Between the D66 and Ž5051 junctions.
2917 Kostrena	4,220	6,143	Adjacent to the D40 junction.
2923 Crikvenica	7,637	14,768	Between the two Ž5091 junctions.
2928 N. Vinodolski – north	7,596	13,911	Between the Ž5062 and Ž5064 junctions.
2929 Senj – north	3,938	8,473	Adjacent to the Ž5109 junction.
4102 Sveti Juraj	3,732	8,618	Between the D23 and Ž5126 junctions.
4105 Vlaka	2,914	7,179	Adjacent to the D405 junction.
4207 Karlobag	1,046	2,720	Adjacent to the D25 junction.
4802 Starigrad (Paklenica)	3,665	7,812	Adjacent to the Ž6008 junction.
4925 Posedarje – east	4,082	9,814	Adjacent to the L63028 junction.
4810 Murvica	13,056	18,763	Adjacent to the Ž6011 junction.
4825 Bibinje	11,971	18,791	Adjacent to the D424 and Ž6039 junctions.
4814 Sukošan	7,293	11,853	Between the Ž6040 and Ž6045 junctions.
5305 Pirovac	4,864	9,898	Between the Ž6068 and D59 junctions.
5308 Šibenik	14,071	22,449	Adjacent to the Ž6088 junction.
5309 Grebaštica	5,255	10,780	Between the D58 and the Ž6127 junction.
5407 Marina	4,364	8,427	Adjacent to the Ž6130 junction.
5423 Solin	40,557	46, 476	Between the Ž6137 and Ž6139 junctions.
5422 Stobreč	49,443	57,642	Between the D410 and Ž6143 junctions.
5902 Jesenice	11,155	16,410	Adjacent to the Ž6162 junction.
5916 Omiš – West	15,654	20,430	Adjacent to the D70 junction.
5909 Mimice – east	5,433	10,066	Adjacent to the Ž6167 junction.
5910 Brela	6,173	12,202	Adjacent to the D39 junction.
6004 Živogošće	3,118	6,876	Adjacent to the D412 junction.
6005 Gradac	3,521	6,294	Adjacent to the L67204 junction.
6010 Rogotin	8,562	13,831	Adjacent to the D413 junction. Average daily traffic figure is provided instead of AADT.
6501 Klek	5,063	10,414	Adjacent to the Ž6279 junction.
6503 Zaton Doli	4,556	9,338	Between the Ž6227 and D414 junctions.
6601 Zaton	7,788	9,338	Adjacent to the Ž6254 junction.
6602 Kupari	12,286	17,778	Adjacent to the Ž6243 junction. The AADT figure estimated by Hrvatske ceste.
6604 Gruda – southeast	3,626	6,124	Adjacent to the Ž6241 junction. Average daily traffic figure is provided instead of AADT.

Note: All the traffic counting sites are located along the D8 road.

== Major intersections ==
Listed settlements contain additional intersections with local and/or non-categorized roads.
The intersections are at-grade except where otherwise noted.

County	km	Location	Junction	Notes
Primorje-Gorski Kotar	0	Pasjak border crossing	G7 E61	Pasjak border crossing to Slovenia. Northern terminus of the road and of the European route E61; Northbound D8 traffic defaults to Slovenian G7 road
Primorje-Gorski Kotar	3	Pasjak		
Primorje-Gorski Kotar	5	Šapjane		
Primorje-Gorski Kotar	6		Ž5017	Connection to Rupa, Škalnica and Saršoni
Primorje-Gorski Kotar	6	Rupa interchange	A7 E61	Connection to A7 motorway Rupa interchange and to Rupa border crossing to Slovenia; The D8 and the E61 north of the interchange are concurrent; A parclo interchange
Primorje-Gorski Kotar	15	Permani	Ž5012	To Vodice and Jelovice border crossing to Slovenia
Primorje-Gorski Kotar	15	Permani	Ž5016	To Breza
Primorje-Gorski Kotar	16	Mučići		
Primorje-Gorski Kotar	16–18	Jurdani	A7 E61	Connection (via a short connector) to the A7 motorway (E61) in Jurdani interchange (executed as a trumpet interchange)
Primorje-Gorski Kotar	19	Jušići	Ž5019	To Spinčići and Kastav
Primorje-Gorski Kotar	20–23	Matulji	A8 E751	Connection to the A8 motorway (E751) in Opatija junction (executed as an at-grade intersection)
Primorje-Gorski Kotar	20–23	Matulji	D66	To Opatija and Lovran
Primorje-Gorski Kotar	20–23	Matulji	Ž5051	To Opatija
Primorje-Gorski Kotar	23–37	Rijeka	D304	To Kastav and the A7 motorway Diračje interchange (E61)
Primorje-Gorski Kotar	23–37	Rijeka	D403	To the Port of Rijeka (west) and the A7 motorway in Škurinje interchange (E61)
Primorje-Gorski Kotar	23–37	Rijeka	D3	To Karlovac and the A6 motorway in Čavle interchange (E65)
Primorje-Gorski Kotar	23–37	Rijeka	D404	To the Port of Rijeka (Brajdica Terminal) and the A7 motorway in Draga interchange (E65)
Primorje-Gorski Kotar	23–37	Rijeka	Ž5054	To the Orehovica interchange. The interchange allows A6 and A7 traffic to exit to the Ž5054, but it does not permit access to the interchange from the county road.
Primorje-Gorski Kotar	23–37	Rijeka	Ž5057	Connecting areas within the city of Rijeka itself only
Primorje-Gorski Kotar	38–40	Kostrena		
Primorje-Gorski Kotar	44		D40 E65	To the A7 motorway Sveti Kuzam interchange (E65), the A6 motorway Čavle interchange (E65) and Kukuljanovo industrial zone and Bakar; The northern terminus of the D8/E65 concurrency
Primorje-Gorski Kotar	47		Ž5060	To Bakar and Meja
Primorje-Gorski Kotar	51	Bakarac		
Primorje-Gorski Kotar	53–54	Kraljevica		
Primorje-Gorski Kotar	55		Ž5065	To Kraljevica
Primorje-Gorski Kotar	55		D102 D523	To Krk and Cres (via the D102 and the A6 motorway Oštrovica interchange (E65) (via the D523); A diamond interchange
Primorje-Gorski Kotar	59		D501	To the A6 motorway Oštrovica interchange (E65)
Primorje-Gorski Kotar	60		Ž5088	To Jadranovo (the Ž5088 loops between the D8 and Jadranovo and they form two intersections)
Primorje-Gorski Kotar	61		Ž5088	To Jadranovo
Primorje-Gorski Kotar	65		Ž5090	To Dramalj
Primorje-Gorski Kotar	66–69	Crikvenica	Ž5091	The Ž5091 connects parts of Crikvenica only
Primorje-Gorski Kotar	70–72	Selce	Ž5092	The Ž5092 connects parts of Selce only
Primorje-Gorski Kotar	72		Ž5062	To Jargovo, Bribir, Lukovo and Fužine
Primorje-Gorski Kotar	76–79	Novi Vinodolski	Ž5064	To Bribir, Drvenik and Križišće
Primorje-Gorski Kotar	76–79	Novi Vinodolski	Ž5094	To Bater and Breze
Primorje-Gorski Kotar	81	Povile		
Primorje-Gorski Kotar	85	Klenovica	Ž5109	The Ž5109 connects to further parts of Klenovica only
Primorje-Gorski Kotar	86		Ž5110	To Krivi Put and Prokike
Primorje-Gorski Kotar	93	Sibinj		
Lika-Senj	98–101	Senj	D23 E65	To the A1 motorway in Žuta Lokva interchange and to Josipdol; The D8 and the E65 are concurrent north of the intersection, where the E65 switches between the D8 (north of Senj) and the D23
Lika-Senj	106	Kalic		
Lika-Senj	109	Sveti Juraj	Ž5126	To Krasno Polje, Velika Plana, Smiljan and Gospić
Lika-Senj	136		D405	To Jablanac and ferry connection to Mišnjak, Rab (D105)
Lika-Senj	149		D406	To Prizna and ferry connection to Žigljen, Pag (D106)
Lika-Senj	156	Cesarica		
Lika-Senj	158	Ribarica		
Lika-Senj	162	Karlobag	D25	To Gospić
Lika-Senj	181	Lukovo Šugarje		
Lika-Senj	191	Barić Draga		
Zadar	198	Tribanj Krušćica		
Zadar	200	Tribanj Šibuljina		
Zadar	209–211	Starigrad	Ž6008	To Paklenica National Park
Zadar	214	Seline		
Zadar	220	Modric		
Zadar	222	Rovanjska		
Zadar	224	Maslenica interchange	A1 E65	Connection to the A1 motorway Maslenica interchange (E65) via a short connector; The Maslenica interchange is executed as a trumpet
Zadar	225		D54	To Maslenica and Zaton Obrovački
Zadar	226	Maslenica Bridge		
Zadar	231	Posedarje		
Zadar	232		D106	To Pag and the A1 motorway Posedarje interchange (E65)
Zadar	235		Ž6258	To Islam Latinski
Zadar	236	Zadar 1 interchange	A1 E65	To the A1 motorway Zadar 1 interchange (E65), reached via a short connector; The interchange is executed as a trumpet
Zadar	240	Poličnik		
Zadar	246	Murvica		
Zadar	250		Ž6018	To Crno and Babindub
Zadar	251–256	Zadar	D306	To Nin and Vir
Zadar	251–256	Zadar	D407	To Zadar ferry port – ferry access to Preko, Ugljan Island (D110), Brbinj and Sali, Dugi otok (D109), Mali Lošinj (D100) as well as to Iž, Rava, Molat, Sestrunj, Zverinac, Ist, Silba, Olib and Premuda
Zadar	251–256	Zadar	D424	To Port of Zadar, Gaženica, Zadar Airport and the A1 motorway Zadar 2 interchange
Zadar	251–256	Zadar	Ž6262	To the Babindub interchange of the D424 expressway (via Benkovačka Street)
Zadar	251–256	Zadar	Ž6037	Connection to the Ž6036 road
Zadar	251–256	Zadar	Ž6038	The Ž6038 connects to areas of the city of Zadar only
Zadar	257–259	Bibinje		
Zadar	262	Sukošan	Ž6040	To the Tromilja interchange of the D424 expressway
Zadar	269	Sveti Petar na moru	Ž6045	To Donje Raštane
Zadar	274	Turanj		
Zadar	275	Sveti Filip i Jakov	Ž6046	To Sikovo
Zadar	278	Biograd na moru	D503	To Biograd ferry port, Benkovac and the A1 motorway Benkovac interchange (E65); Hybrid parclo interchange
Zadar	281		Ž6063	To Crvena Luka ferry port
Zadar	284–285	Pakoštane		
Zadar	288	Drage		
Šibenik-Knin	300–302	Pirovac	Ž6068	To Kašić Banjevački and Stankovci
Šibenik-Knin	304		D59 D121	To Knin (via the D59) and to Tisno and Murter (via the D121)
Šibenik-Knin	307		Ž6086	To Tribunj
Šibenik-Knin	312–313	Vodice	Ž6087	To Srima; The Ž6087 loops from Vodice to Srima and back to the D8
Šibenik-Knin	316		Ž6087	To Srima
Šibenik-Knin	316		L65036	To Jadrija; Trumpet interchange
Šibenik-Knin	318		D27	To Benkovac
Šibenik-Knin	318		Ž6088	To Zaton
Šibenik-Knin	318	Šibenik Bridge		
Šibenik-Knin	321–329	Šibenik	D33	To Šibenik ferry port, Drniš and Knin; Parclo interchange
Šibenik-Knin	321–329	Šibenik	D533	To the A1 motorway Šibenik interchange (E65); Trumpet interchange
Šibenik-Knin	321–329	Šibenik	D58	To Port of Šibenik and Boraja; Parclo interchange
Šibenik-Knin	329		Ž6107	To Solaris resort; Modified trumpet interchange
Šibenik-Knin	330–333	Brodarica		
Šibenik-Knin	335	Žaborić	Ž6108	To Jadrtovac
Šibenik-Knin	340	Grabeštica	Ž6127	To Sapina Doca
Šibenik-Knin	351–352	Primošten		
Šibenik-Knin	358		Ž6126	To Rogoznica
Šibenik-Knin	363		Ž6128	To Dvornica
Šibenik-Knin	366	Svinca		
Split-Dalmatia	370–372	Marina	Ž6130	To Gustirna, Mitlo and Blizna Donja
Split-Dalmatia	370–372	Marina	Ž6135	To Vinišće
Split-Dalmatia	374	Poljica	Ž6131	To Vrsine
Split-Dalmatia	378–382	Seget	D58	To Boraja; Diamond interchange, accessible to northbound D8 traffic and traffic joining southbound D8 only
Split-Dalmatia	378–382	Seget	Ž6132	To Sorići and Seget Donji
Split-Dalmatia	378–382	Seget	Ž6133	To Trogir
Split-Dalmatia	382–385	Trogir	Ž6133	To the D315 road
Split-Dalmatia	382–385	Trogir	Ž6134	To the D126 road
Split-Dalmatia	387		D409 Ž6091	To Trogir and Split Airport (via the D315) and to Plano via the Ž6091
Split-Dalmatia	391	Kaštela		
Split-Dalmatia	403		Ž6137	To Kaštela; Partial diamond interchange, accessible to northbound D8 traffic and traffic joining southbound D8 only
Split-Dalmatia	404		Ž6139 Ž6253	To Split (via the Ž6139 and Solinska Street) and to Solin and Klis (via the Ž6253)
Split-Dalmatia	405–410	Split	D1 E71	To A1 motorway Dugopolje interchange (E65); A roundabout interchange with the D8 as the primary road
Split-Dalmatia	405–410	Split	D410	To Split to the Port of Split – Jadrolinija ferry access to Supetar, Bol and Milna on Brač Island, Stari Grad and Jelsa on Hvar Island, Rogač on Šolta Island, as well as to Vis and Lastovo islands. A partial diamond interchange
Split-Dalmatia	405–410	Split	Ž6140	The Ž6140 connects the D8 to parts of the city of Split only
Split-Dalmatia	405–410	Split	Ž6143	To Kamen
Split-Dalmatia	411	Stobreč	Ž6142	To Žrnovnica and Tugare
Split-Dalmatia	411	Stobreč	Ž6144	To TTTS business zone
Split-Dalmatia	414	Podstrana	Ž6162	The Ž6162 connects the D8 to parts of Podstrana only
Split-Dalmatia	422	Jesenice		
Split-Dalmatia	423	Dugi Rat		
Split-Dalmatia	426	Duće		
Split-Dalmatia	427–430	Omiš	D70	To A1 motorway Blato na Cetini interchange and Gata (E65)
Split-Dalmatia	427–430	Omiš	Ž6166	To Kučiće, Slime and the D39 state road
Split-Dalmatia	433	Stanići		
Split-Dalmatia	434	Čelina		
Split-Dalmatia	437		Ž6168	To Lokva
Split-Dalmatia	443	Marušići	Ž6167	To Mimice and Lokva
Split-Dalmatia	448		D39	To A1 motorway Šestanovac interchange (E65) and Aržano
Split-Dalmatia	452		Ž6195	To Brela
Split-Dalmatia	454–456	Baška Voda	D76	To A1 motorway Zagvozd interchange (E65)
Split-Dalmatia	463–467	Makarska	D411	To Makarska ferry port
Split-Dalmatia	463–467	Makarska	D512	To A1 motorway Ravča interchange (E65)
Split-Dalmatia	463–467	Makarska	Ž6196	To Veliko Brdo
Split-Dalmatia	463–467	Makarska	Ž6197	To connecting the D8 and the D411 via an alternate route running through Makarska
Split-Dalmatia	470	Tučepi		
Split-Dalmatia	473	Podgora	Ž6198	To the D512 state road
Split-Dalmatia	484	Živogošće		
Split-Dalmatia	493	Drvenik	D412	To Drvenik ferry port
Split-Dalmatia	497	Zaostrog		
Split-Dalmatia	501	Podaca		
Split-Dalmatia	503	Brist		
Split-Dalmatia	505	Gradac		
Dubrovnik-Neretva	516–519	Ploče	D413	To Port of Ploče
Dubrovnik-Neretva	516–519	Ploče	D425 E65	To A1 motorway Ploče interchange and onwards to Bosnia and Herzegovina via the D62 and Mali Prolog border crossing or via the A10 and Metković border crossing; The D8 and the D65 are concurrent south of the intersection
Dubrovnik-Neretva	516–519	Ploče	Ž6126	To the D413 state road
Dubrovnik-Neretva	520	Čeveljuša interchange	D425	Expressway to the D513 state road; As of September 2011, the route is incomplete and planned to connect Ploče to the A1 motorway Ploče interchange; Connection to the D513 is provisional; A trumpet interchange
Dubrovnik-Neretva	522		Ž6217	To Rogotin and Komin
Dubrovnik-Neretva	523	Neretva Bridge		
Dubrovnik-Neretva	543	Duboka		Area adjacent to Duboka (to the west) is site of the north abutment of the Pelješac Bridge
Dubrovnik-Neretva	546	Klek		
Dubrovnik-Neretva	548	Klek border crossing		The road extends south of the border crossing
9.3-kilometre (5.8 mi) section of Adriatic Highway through Neum corridor in Bosnia and Herzegovina
Dubrovnik-Neretva	549	Zaton Doli border crossing		
Dubrovnik-Neretva	554		Ž6227	To Sveti Nikola
Dubrovnik-Neretva	560		D414	To Ston and Orebić ferry port
Dubrovnik-Neretva	564	Doli		
Dubrovnik-Neretva	575–576	Slano		
Dubrovnik-Neretva	590	Trsteno	Ž6228	To Slano and Rudine
Dubrovnik-Neretva	593	Orašac		
Dubrovnik-Neretva	596–600	Zaton		
Dubrovnik-Neretva	602–603	Lozica	Ž6254	To Mokošica, Komolac, and Sustjepan (D420)
Dubrovnik-Neretva	604	Franjo Tuđman Bridge		
Dubrovnik-Neretva	604–608	Dubrovnik	D420 E80	To Gruž (Port of Dubrovnik) and Sustjepan; The D8 and the European route E80 are concurrent south of the intersection
Dubrovnik-Neretva	612		D223	To Gornji Brgat and Gornji Brgat border crossing to Bosnia and Herzegovina
Dubrovnik-Neretva	613	Čibača		
Dubrovnik-Neretva	615	Kupari		
Dubrovnik-Neretva	616	Župa Dubrovačka	Ž6243	To Petrača, Grbavac and Brgat
Dubrovnik-Neretva	617	Mlini		
Dubrovnik-Neretva	618	Zavrelje		
Dubrovnik-Neretva	619	Soline		
Dubrovnik-Neretva	620	Plat		
Dubrovnik-Neretva	623	Zvekovica	Ž6238	To Cavtat
Dubrovnik-Neretva	623	Zvekovica	Ž6239	To Drvenik
Dubrovnik-Neretva	623	Zvekovica	Ž6266	To Vučje Ždrijelo
Dubrovnik-Neretva	627	Dubrovnik Airport		Dubrovnik Airport is directly accessed by the D8
Dubrovnik-Neretva	629	Čilipi		
Dubrovnik-Neretva	636		Ž6240	To Radovčići
Dubrovnik-Neretva	637–638	Gruda	Ž6241	To Dubravka
Dubrovnik-Neretva	640	Karasovići	D516	To Vitaljina and Konfin border crossing to Montenegro
Dubrovnik-Neretva	643	Karasovići border crossing	M-1 E65 E80	Border crossing to Montenegro; The southern terminus of the route, extending as Montenegrin route M-1 and the southern terminus of the D8 and European routes E65 and E80
1.000 mi = 1.609 km; 1.000 km = 0.621 mi: Concurrency terminus; Incomplete access; Unopened

== See also ==
- Adriatic Highway
