= D306 road =

Road in Croatia

D306 state road

Route information
- Length: 29.6 km (18.4 mi)

Major junctions
- From: D8 in Zadar
- To: Vir

Location
- Country: Croatia
- Counties: Zadar
- Major cities: Zadar, Nin, Vir

Highway system
- Highways in Croatia

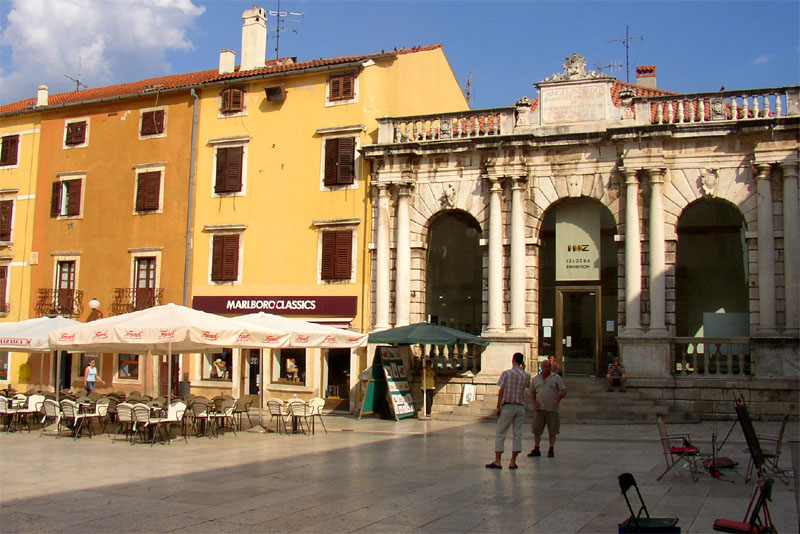
Zadar, at the southern terminus of the D306 road

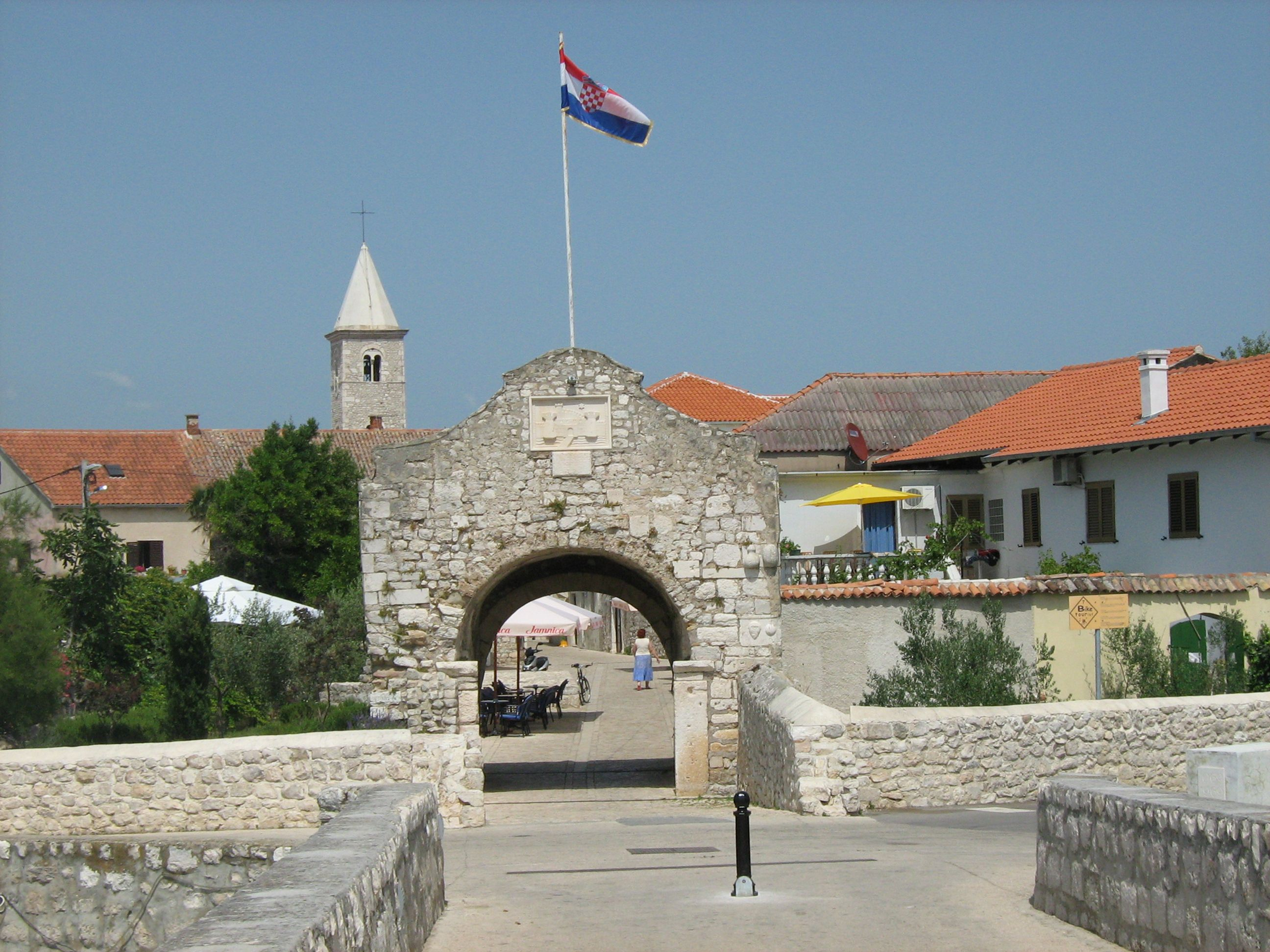
Nin, on the D306 route

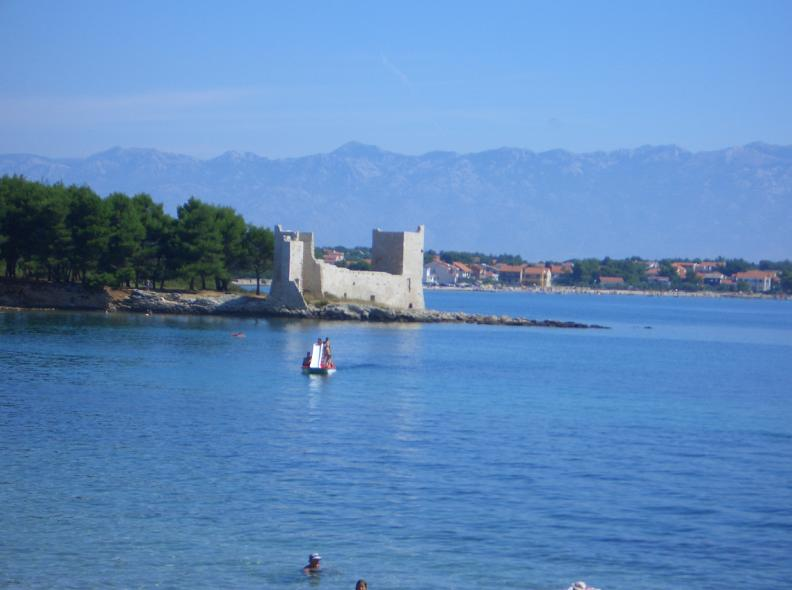
Vir, at the northern terminus of the D306 road

D306 is a state road connecting Zadar in the northern Dalmatia, Croatia to the town of Nin and the island of Vir. The road is 29.6 km (18.4 mi) long.

The road also serves a number of resorts on the Adriatic coast north of Zadar.

The road, as well as all other state roads in Croatia, is managed and maintained by Hrvatske ceste, state owned company.

== Traffic volume ==
Traffic is regularly counted and reported by Hrvatske ceste, operator of the road. Substantial variations between annual (AADT) and summer (ASDT) traffic volumes are attributed to the fact that the road connects a number of summer resorts to Croatian motorway network and to the city of Zadar, the regional centre.

D306 traffic volume
Road	Counting site	AADT	ASDT	Notes
D306	4808 Kožino	7,811	16,057	Adjacent to L63049 junction (south of the junction).

== Road junctions and populated areas ==
D306 junctions/populated areas
Type	Slip roads/Notes
	Zadar; D8 to Biograd na Moru, Maslenica and to A1 motorway Zadar 1 and Zadar 2 interchanges. The southern terminus of the road.
	Kožino; L63049 to Ninski Stanovi.
	Ž6012 to Petrčane and Punta Skala resort.
	Zaton
	Ž6010 to Zaton resort.
	Nin; Ž6011 to Murvica and Zemunik Donji.
	Privlaka
	Vir; The northern terminus of the road.
