= Adam Muchtin =

Slovak Catholic priest (1908–1994)

Adam Muchtin (Velké Rovné near Žilina, December 4, 1908 – Trsat, August 21, 1994), was a Slovak Catholic priest, painter, and translator, and a professor of church art at the Theological Faculty in Rijeka.

== Early life and education ==
He was born in Velké Rovné, where his father Adam (1880) and mother Veronika (1879) were also from, and was baptized on the same day as his birth in the local parish church of St. Michael. In 1910, the family moved to Croatia and settled in Trsat, where his father opened a tin and wire workshop that survived even after the decline of the cable car industry at the end of World War I. Adam's older brother Josip died as a child in Slovakia, and his younger sister Marija was born in 1911 in Trsat. With the outbreak of World War I, his father was conscripted and served on several fronts. Despite being captured by the Russians, he returned to Trsat after the war. During the war, his mother often traveled to Ogulin and Karlovac, where she sold agricultural products at the Sušak market. From 1915 to 1919, Adam attended primary school in Trsat, then attended the Sušak Real Gymnasium (1919–1923) and the Commercial Academy, graduating in 1937. After graduation, he was admitted to the seminary and studied theology at the Theological Faculty in Zagreb (1927–1931).

== Priesthood ==
He was ordained a deacon by the auxiliary bishop of Zagreb Dominik Premuš in the Zagreb Cathedral on March 1, 1931, and later the same year, on June 29, he was ordained a priest by Archbishop Antun Bauer. He celebrated his first Mass at the Church of Our Lady on Trsat on July 5. His priestly ministry began in Senj, where he taught at the women's vocational school.

In May 1932, his younger sister died of tuberculosis. Two weeks before her death, he was appointed chaplain of the Banovina Hospital in Sušak, and he also taught religion at the primary school in Vežica and the women's primary school in Sušak.

In March 1935, he was appointed chaplain of the Crusader Brotherhood. Muchtin was the owner of the Sušak Catholic weekly Istina, which was edited by Don Josip Blažina (1938–1941). The paper was aligned with the Croatian Catholic Movement.

To expand Sušak, Don Adam Muchtin initiated the construction of the Church of St. Thérèse of Lisieux and blessed the foundation stone on Easter Monday 1940. The work was completed in September 1942. According to the painter Carmino Butković-Visintini, he enriched the sanctuary with a mural of Saint Thérèse of Lisieux, installed a harmonium, and encouraged the development of choir and organ music. To acquire organs for the Vežica church, he sold part of his family house in Trsat in 1964. The organs were built by Jenka according to the specifications of Albe Vidaković. From 1971 to 1983, he was the parish priest of the St. George Parish in Trsat.

In August 1993, he was diagnosed with a tumor on the right side of his lung. He was hospitalized again a year later due to exhaustion. He died on August 21, 1994, in the Sušak Hospital. His funeral at the Trsat Cemetery was conducted by Archbishop Msgr. Anton Tamarut in the presence of a large congregation. On the Feast of St. Joseph in 2013, his remains and those of his family were moved to the Parish Church of St. Thérèse of Lisieux in Podvežica.

== Legacy ==
For the parish church in Podvežica, he painted a picture of the Blessed Virgin Mary, Saint Joseph, an altar painting of St. Thérèse of Lisieux, and a painting of St. Thérèse of Lisieux as a sacristan. For the church in Bakarac, he created altarpieces of the Holy Family and St. Thérèse of Lisieux. In the Sanctuary of Our Lady of Gorica on the island of Krk, there are fourteen paintings of the Stations of the Cross by Muchtin. He translated the book Christ and Modern Man by Andrej Kliman from Slovak, and several educational and spiritual articles, the Italian book The Life of Saint Louise de Marillac by Angelo Troisio, probably for the Sisters of Charity with whom he worked at the Banovina Hospital in Sušak, and the Slovene book Church Art by Franc Stele. He also translated the play The Sacrifice of the Confession Secret by Josip Spillmann for the Crusader Brotherhood in Sušak. Other translations, from various foreign languages, were related to his work as a professor of church art at the Theological Faculty in Rijeka and several authored manuscripts: Critique of Art, Stone, Wood, Metal, and Color, History of Christian Art, and Church Equipment. He was also the author of a number of lectures, homilies, and several parish memorials. He published journalistic works in the weekly Istina and the monthly Zvona, and also dabbled in landscape and urban photography.
