= D513 road =

Road in Croatia

D513 state road

Route information
- Length: 16.0 km (9.9 mi)

Major junctions
- From: D62 near Mali Prolog
- To: D8 in Ploče

Location
- Country: Croatia
- Counties: Dubrovnik-Neretva
- Major cities: Ploče

Highway system
- Highways in Croatia

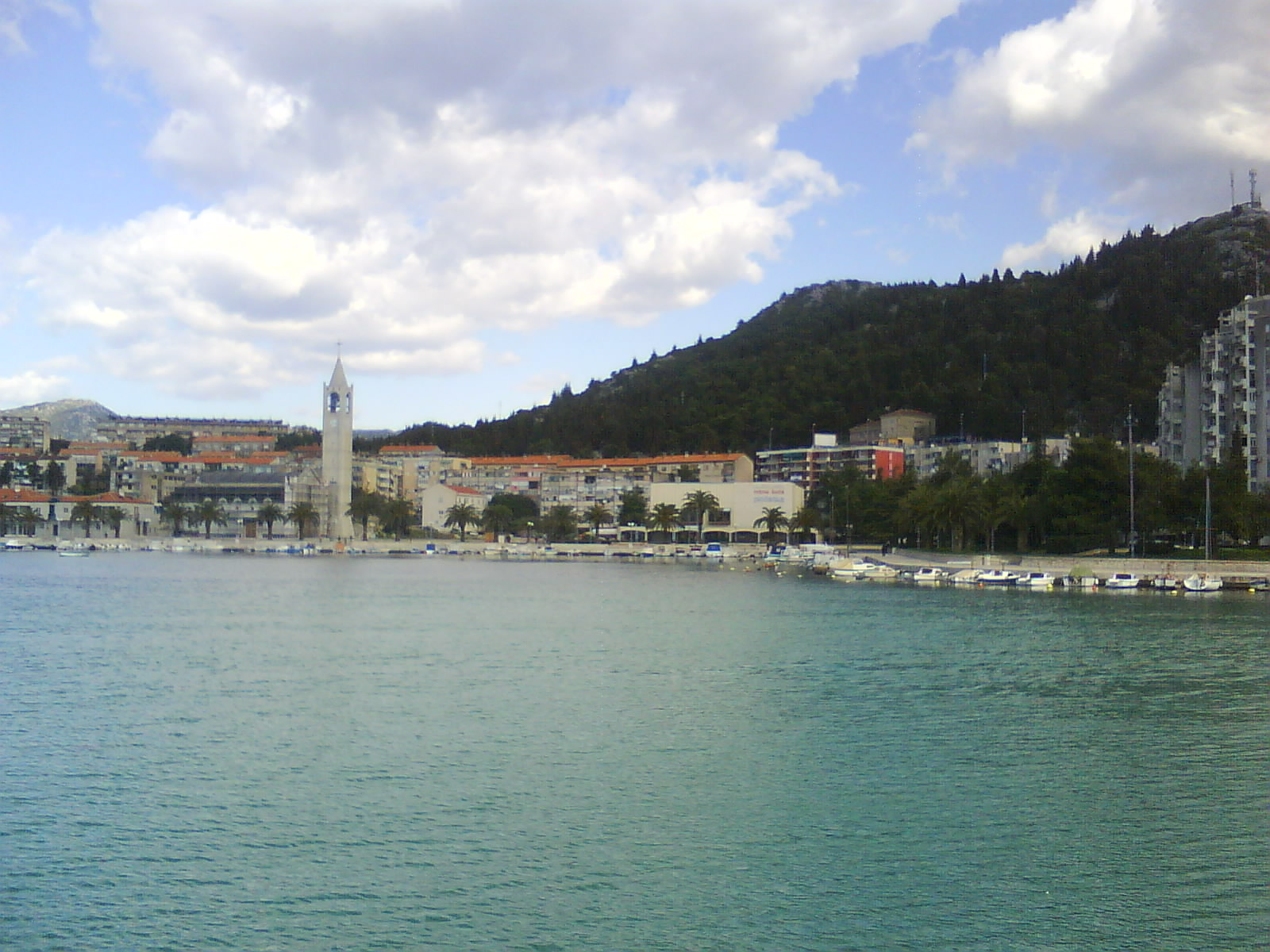
Ploče, at the southern terminus of D513

D513 was a state road in Croatia that had connected Ploče and the D62 state road near Mali Prolog.

In 2010, this road was defined in the Croatian Government's "Decision on categorization of public roads as state roads, county roads and local roads".

After the more modern D425 road was completed, the D513 is no longer classified as such.

This and indeed all other state roads in Croatia are managed and maintained by Hrvatske ceste, state owned company.

== Traffic volume ==
Traffic was regularly counted and reported by Hrvatske ceste, operator of the road. Substantial variations between annual (AADT) and summer (ASDT) traffic volumes are attributed to the fact that the road served as a connection to the A1 motorway and the D8 state road carrying substantial tourist traffic.

D513 traffic volume
Road	Counting site	AADT	ASDT	Notes
D513	6008 Zavala	1,471	2,201	Between the Ž6211 and Ž6208 junctions.
D513	6009 Baćina	2,741	4,238	Adjacent to the D8 junction.

== Road junctions and populated areas ==
D513 junctions/populated areas
Type	Slip roads/Notes
	D62 north of Mali Prolog, to Vrgorac and the A1 motorway Ravča interchange (to the north) and to Metković (to the south). The northern terminus of the road.
	Ž6211 to Otrić Seoci and Dusina.
	Kobiljača
	D425 to Čeveljuša interchange on the D8 state road.
	Ž6208 to Staševica.
	Ploče; D8 to Makarska and Drvenik (to the north) and Opuzen and Dubrovnik (to the south).

== See also ==
- State roads in Croatia
- Hrvatske ceste
