= Povile =

- Village
- Location within Croatia
- Coordinates: 45°07′N 14°49′E
- Country: Croatia
- County: Primorje-Gorski Kotar County
- Municipality: Novi Vinodolski

Area
  - Total: 2.9 km^{2} (1.1 sq mi)

Population (2021)
  - Total: 220
  - Density: 76/km^{2} (200/sq mi)
- Time zone: UTC+1 (CET)
  - Summer (DST): UTC+2 (CEST)

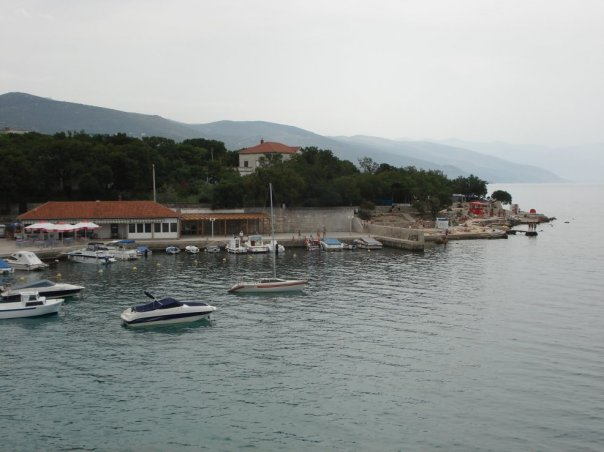
Panorama of the Povile harbor

Povile is a fisherman's village in Croatia on the Adriatic coast beneath the old town of Ledenice (cro. Ledenička Gradina). It is connected by the D8 highway. It has two little chapels, St. Mary Magdalene (Croatian: Sv. Marija Magdalena) and St. John (Croatian: Sv. Ivan). The former is still in use and the latter now is a private storage. The chapel of St. Mary Magdalene was built in the 14th century and St. Mary Magdalen in the saint of Povile, with the day of St. Mary Magdalene being celebrated each year on the night of Povile which falls in summer. Prominent cape near the church of St. Magdalena was named Punta Mandalena and is a favorite camping spot.
