= Lozica, Croatia =

Lozica
- Village
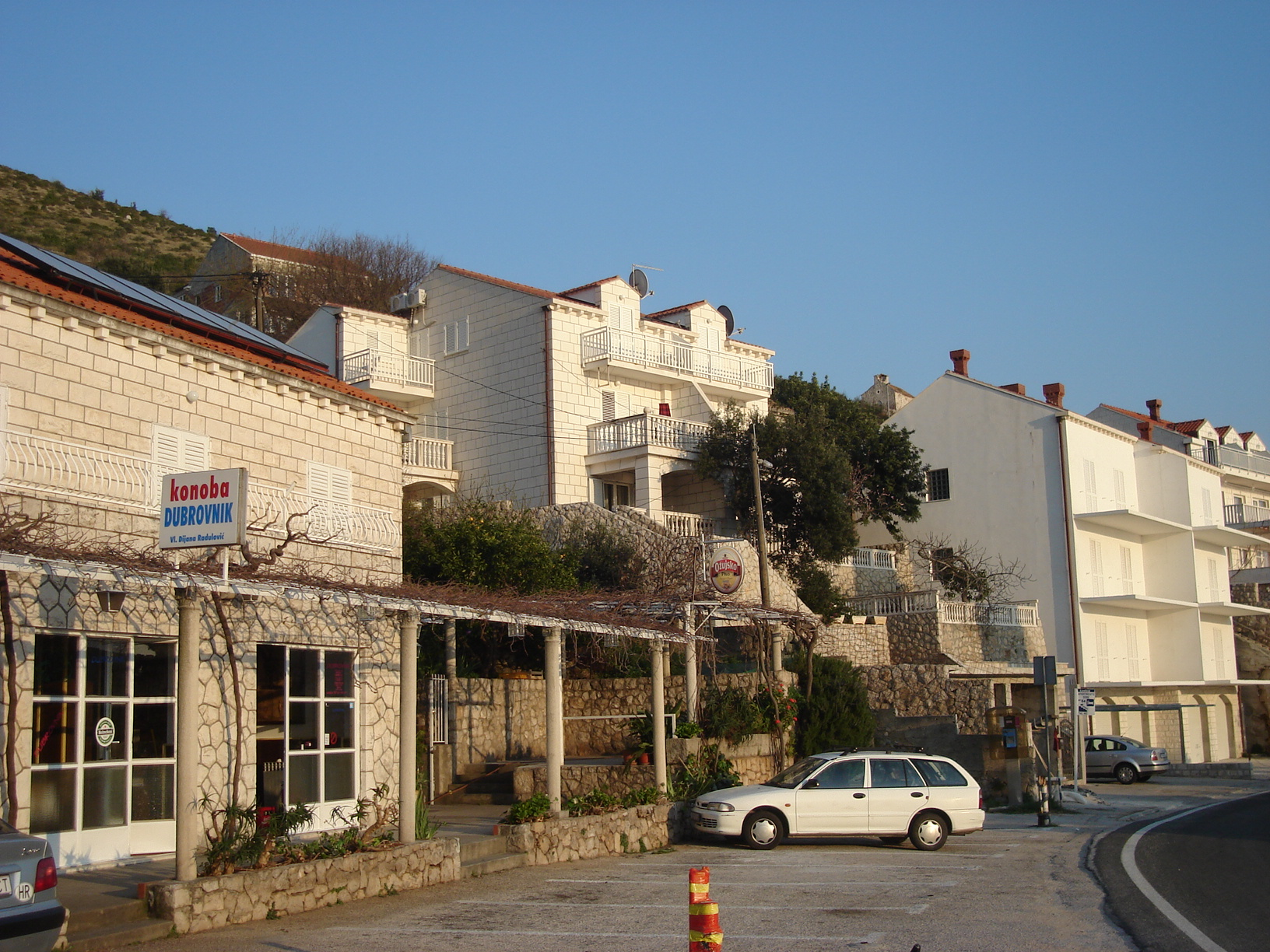
- Street of Lozica
- Interactive map of Lozica
- Location within Croatia
- Country: Croatia
- County: Dubrovnik-Neretva County
- Municipality: Dubrovnik

Area
  - Total: 0.46 sq mi (1.2 km^{2})

Population (2021)
  - Total: 142
  - Density: 310/sq mi (120/km^{2})
- Time zone: UTC+1 (CET)
  - Summer (DST): UTC+2 (CEST)
- Postal code: 20236 Mokošica

Lozica is a village in Croatia. It is located on the D8 state road, west of Dubrovnik, on the west coast of Rijeka Dubrovačka. The Franjo Tuđman Bridge is located east of the village.

== Demographics ==
According to the 2021 census, its population was 142. It was 146 in 2011.
