= Franjo Tuđman Bridge (Dubrovnik) =

Franjo Tuđman Bridge Most dr. Franja Tuđmana
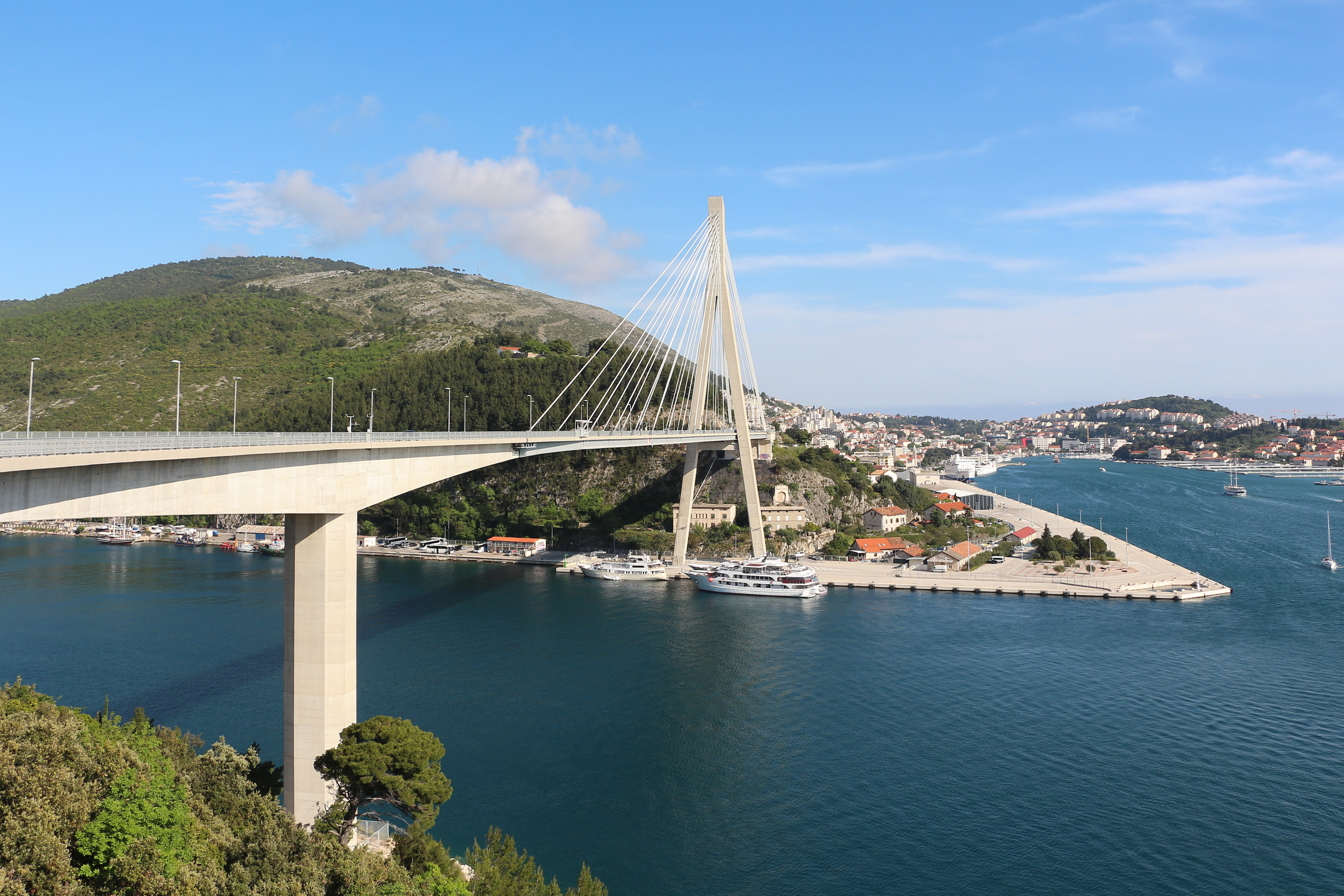
- Coordinates: 42.668269°N 18.079419°E
- Carries: D8
- Locale: Dubrovnik-Neretva County, Croatia
- Named for: Franjo Tuđman
- Maintained by: Hrvatske ceste

Characteristics
- Design: Cable-stayed bridge
- Total length: 518 m (1,699 ft)
- Width: 14.2 m (47 ft)
- Height: 141.5 m (464 ft)
- Longest span: 304.5 m (999 ft)
- Clearance below: 49 m (161 ft)

History
- Construction cost: 252 million HRK (38 million USD)
- Opened: 2002

Statistics
- Toll: None

Location
- Interactive map of Franjo Tuđman Bridge

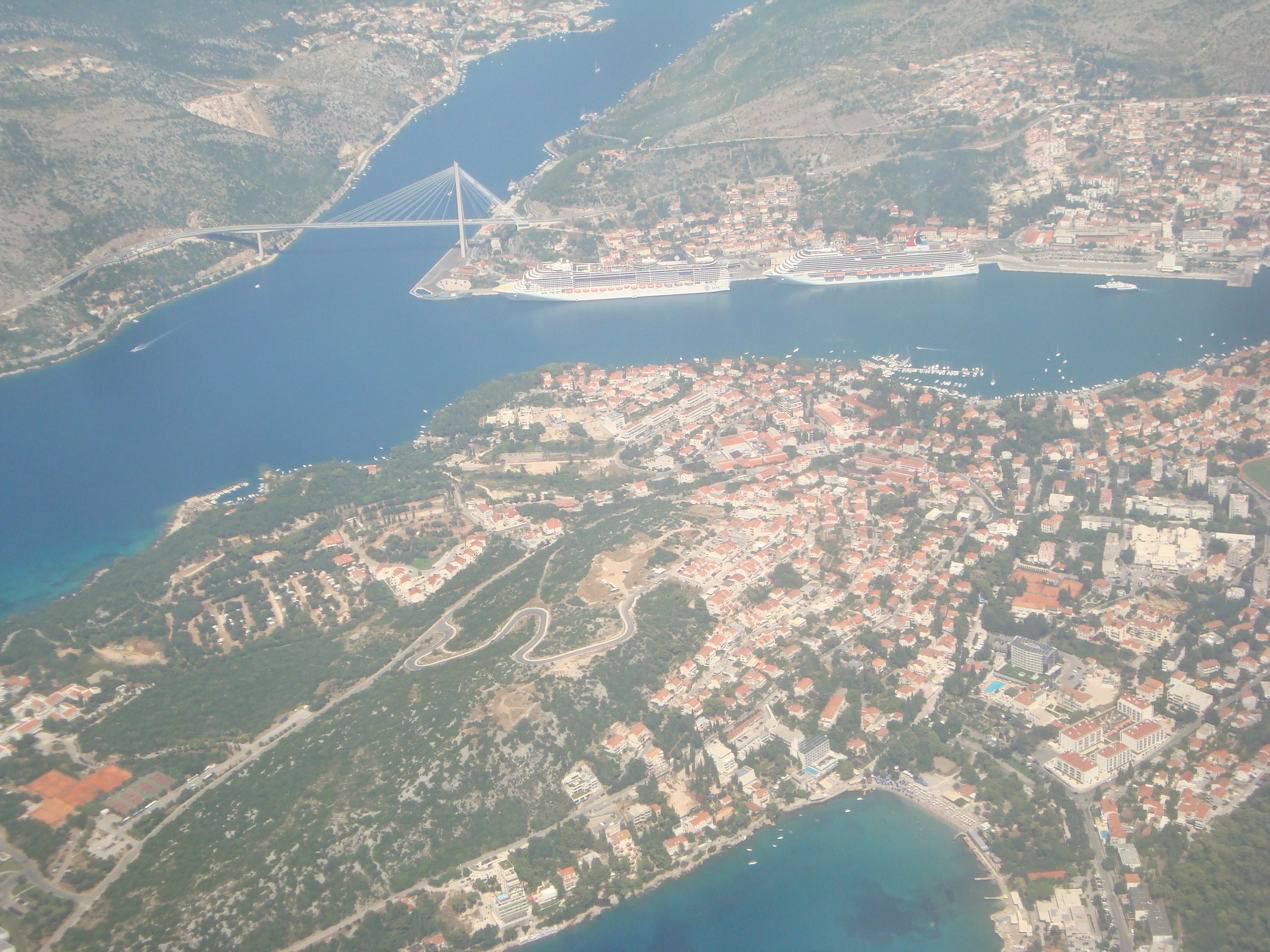
Aerial view of Gruž and the bridge

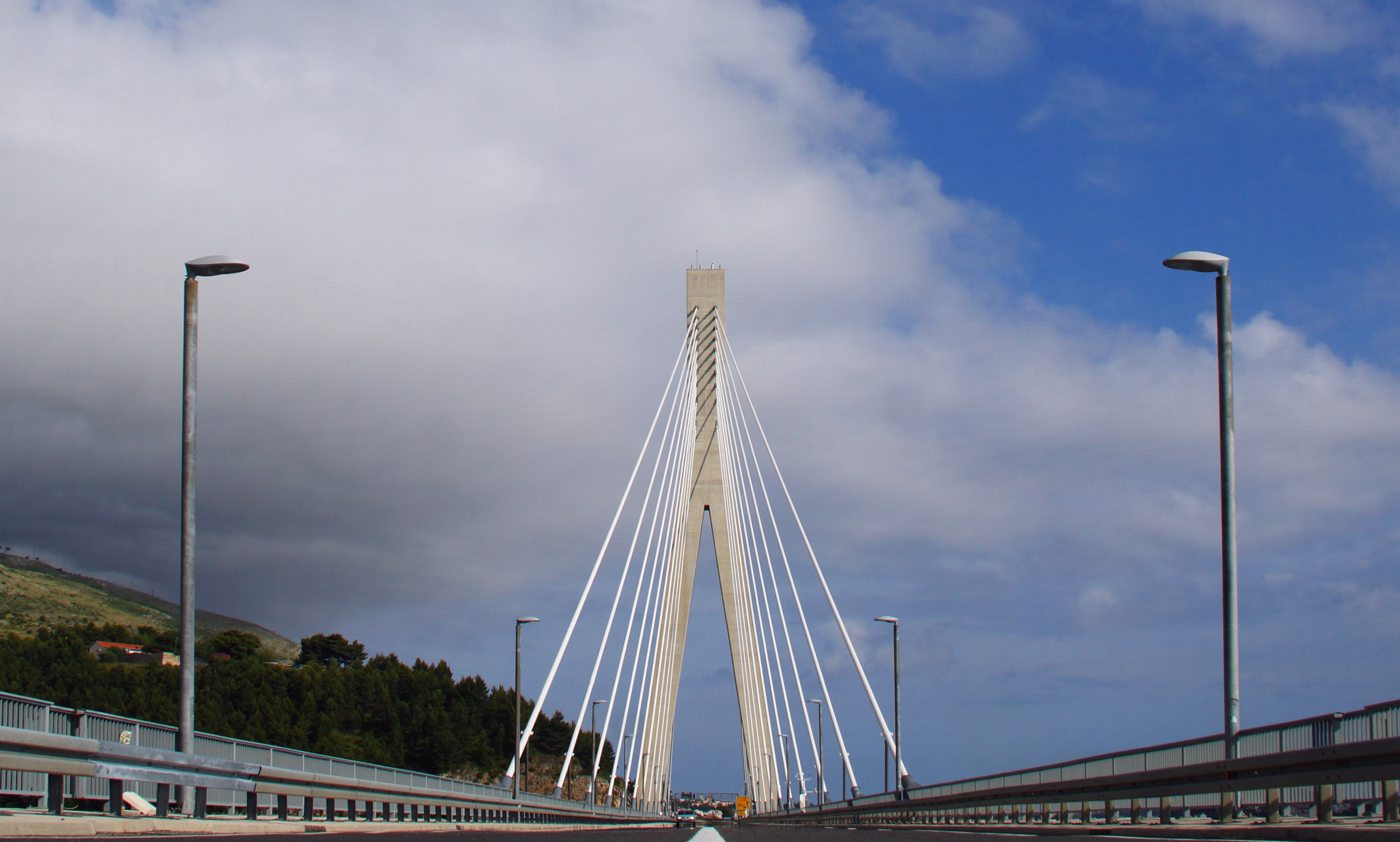
A view of the bridge from the bridge deck

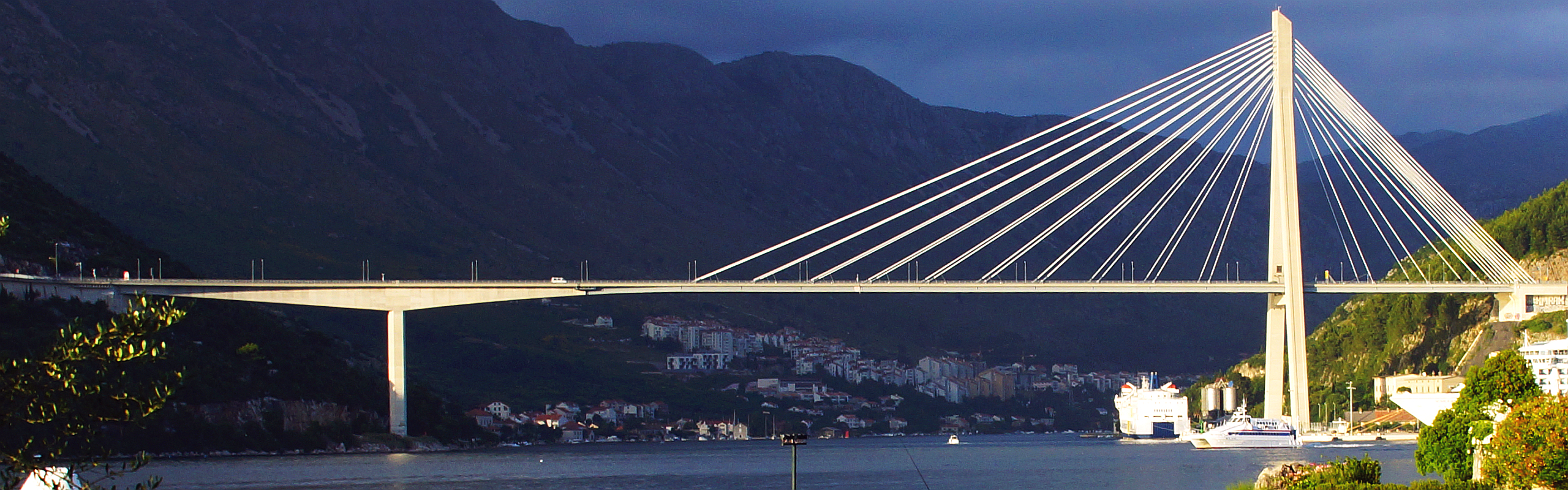
View of the bridge from the sea level of the bay

The Franjo Tuđman Bridge (Croatian: Most dr. Franja Tuđmana) is a cable-stayed bridge carrying the D8 state road at the western approach to Dubrovnik, Croatia across Rijeka Dubrovačka near Port of Gruž. The original bridge design was developed in 1989; however, construction was stopped at the onset of the Croatian War of Independence. Named after the 1st President of Croatia Franjo Tuđman, the bridge has been redesigned by the Structures Department of the University of Zagreb.

== Structure ==
The bridge is 518-metre (1,699 ft) long, measured between the abutments. Substructure of the bridge consists of the abutments, a pier on the western shore supporting a pretensioned girder and an anchoring pier on the eastern shore.

Supported structure on the cable-stayed portion of the bridge consists of a composite girder, an A-shaped pylon and the cable stays. Overall span of the girder is 324.7 m (1,065 ft). Concrete roadway slab is of generally constant depth of 25 cm (10 in). A total of 38 cable stays have been executed, comprising 27 to 61 steel wire cables placed in protective polyethylene pipes.

The pylon is 141.5 m (464 ft) tall, measured from the top surface of the foundations. It comprises a box cross section of varying size. An additional box girder is executed just below the suspended structure providing it an additional support as well as bracing the pylon legs. The cable stays are anchored to the top of the pylon. A special opening has been executed in one of the pylon legs, next to the sidewalk, providing access to the inside of its cross-section, where there are rungs facilitating climbing to the top of the pylon, where another opening on its top allows replacements of the anchors, should that become necessary.

The western part of the bridge comprises a pretensioned girder of variable depth (3.25 m (10.7 ft) at the abutment, 8.22 m (27.0 ft) at the pier and 3.2 m (10 ft) at the end of the cantilever).

== Construction and completion of the bridge ==
Construction of the bridge started in October 1998. The construction works were carried out by Walter Bau AG and Konstruktor, Split. Construction was completed in April 2002, and the bridge was officially opened on May 21, 2002. The bridge construction costs were reportedly 252 million Croatian kuna (c. US$31 million) making Franjo Tuđman Bridge the most expensive bridge in Croatia. Opening of the bridge was characterized by delays due to various permit requirements, so the opening and dedication ceremony was delayed five times.

== Naming controversy ==
Initially, Hrvatske ceste which financed the construction named the bridge the Dubrovnik Bridge (Croatian: Most Dubrovnik). However, even before the official opening of the bridge, there was some controversy regarding the name of the bridge, as the Mayor of Dubrovnik Dubravka Šuica expressed a request that the bridge should be named the Franjo Tuđman Bridge instead. The controversy grew on 10 May 2002, one day before a scheduled opening ceremony, when traffic signs that were supposed to display the name of the bridge were shown on the Croatian Radiotelevision, unsure of the actual name of the bridge. Hrvatske ceste, the operator of the bridge placed signs saying "Dubrovnik Bridge", but next to those were similar signs indicating the name "Franjo Tuđman Bridge". Later, in 2004, the name of the bridge was officially changed to the Franjo Tuđman Bridge. Today, the plate on the pillar reads "Most Dubrovnik" while all traffic signs read "Franjo Tuđman Bridge".

== Traffic volume ==
Traffic on the state roads in Croatia is regularly counted and reported by Hrvatske ceste, operator of the state roads. There is no actual traffic count performed at the Franjo Tuđman Bridge itself; however, Hrvatske ceste operate a counting station which covers a section of the D8 state road adjacent to the D8 and Ž6254 county road junction (to the west of the junction). Since the Franjo Tuđman Bridge is located only 1,200 m (3,900 ft) to the east of the junction, and no other D8 junctions are found between the two, the figure, even though not exact, is highly indicative of the traffic volume carried by the bridge.

Franjo Tuđman Bridge traffic volume
Road	Counting site	AADT	ASDT	Notes
D8	6601 Zaton	7,669	13,085	Adjacent to the D8/Ž6254 junction (to the west).

== See also ==
- D8 state road
- Franjo Tuđman Bridge (Čapljina)
- Franjo Tuđman Bridge (Osijek)
