= D413 road =

Road in Croatia

D413 state road

Route information
- Length: 1.37 km (0.85 mi)

Major junctions
- From: D425 near Ploče
- To: Ploče port

Location
- Country: Croatia
- Counties: Dubrovnik-Neretva
- Major cities: Ploče

Highway system
- Highways in Croatia

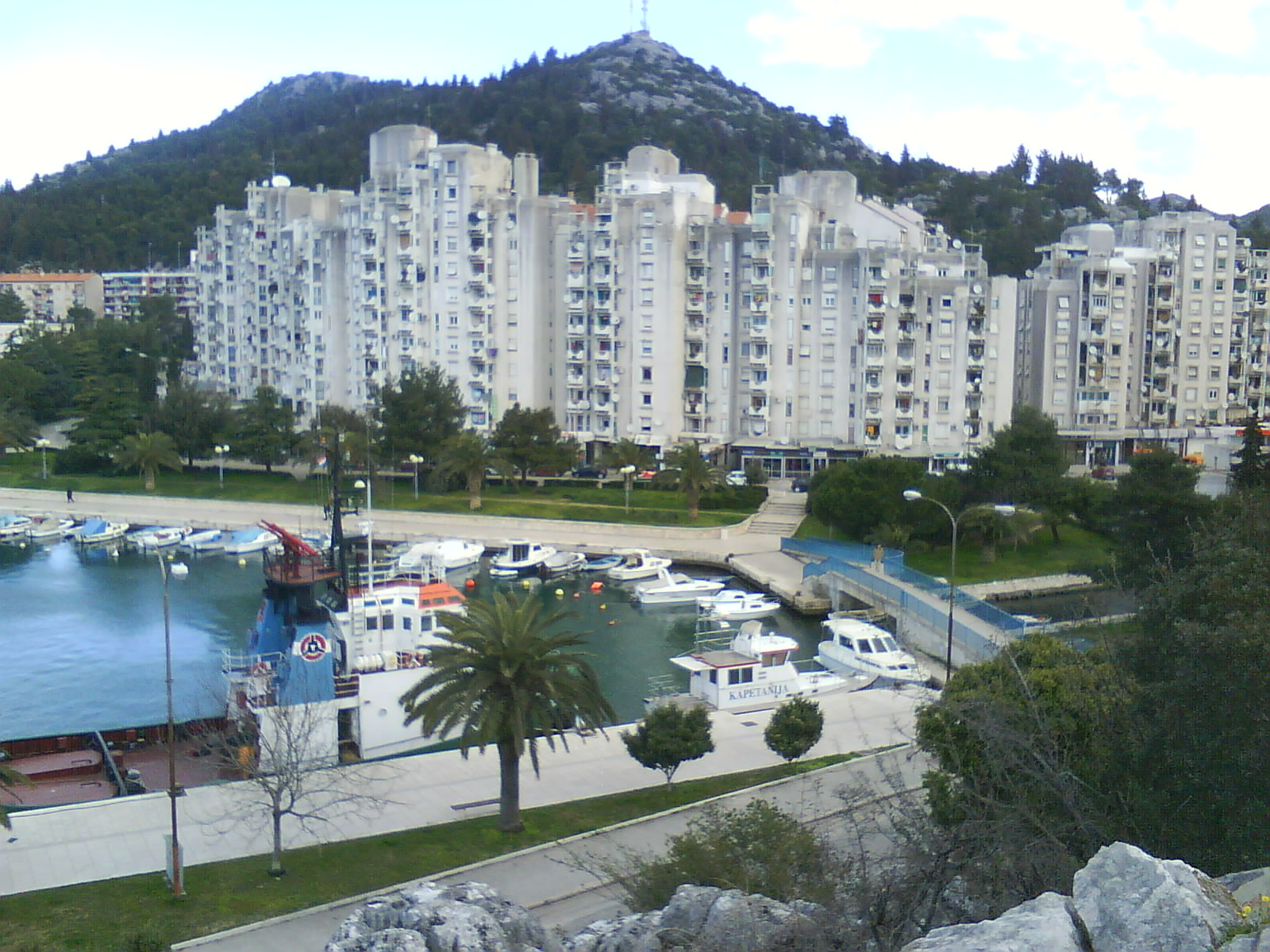
Ploče, at the northern terminus of the D413 road

D413 branches off to the north from D425 in Ploče towards Port of Ploče - providing ferry access to Trpanj on Pelješac peninsula. The road is 1.37 km (0.85 mi) long.

The road, as well as all other state roads in Croatia, is managed and maintained by Hrvatske ceste, a state owned company.

== Traffic volume ==
Traffic is regularly counted on the road by Hrvatske ceste. Substantial variations between annual (AADT) and summer (ASDT) traffic volumes are attributed to the fact that the road connects to a number of summer resorts.

D413 traffic volume
Road	Counting site	AADT	ASDT	Notes
D413	6038 Ploče	2880	3694	1 km between D425 and Ž6216

== Road junctions and populated areas ==
D413 junctions/populated areas
Type	Slip roads/Notes
	Ploče; D425 to Ploče interchange (A1 motorway) and to D8 to the north. The southern terminus of the road.
	Ž6216 to the D8 state road within Ploče itself.
	Port of Ploče - ferry access to Trpanj on Pelješac peninsula (D415). The northern terminus of the road.
