= Franjo Tuđman Bridge (Čapljina) =

Franjo Tuđman Bridge Most dr. Franje Tuđmana
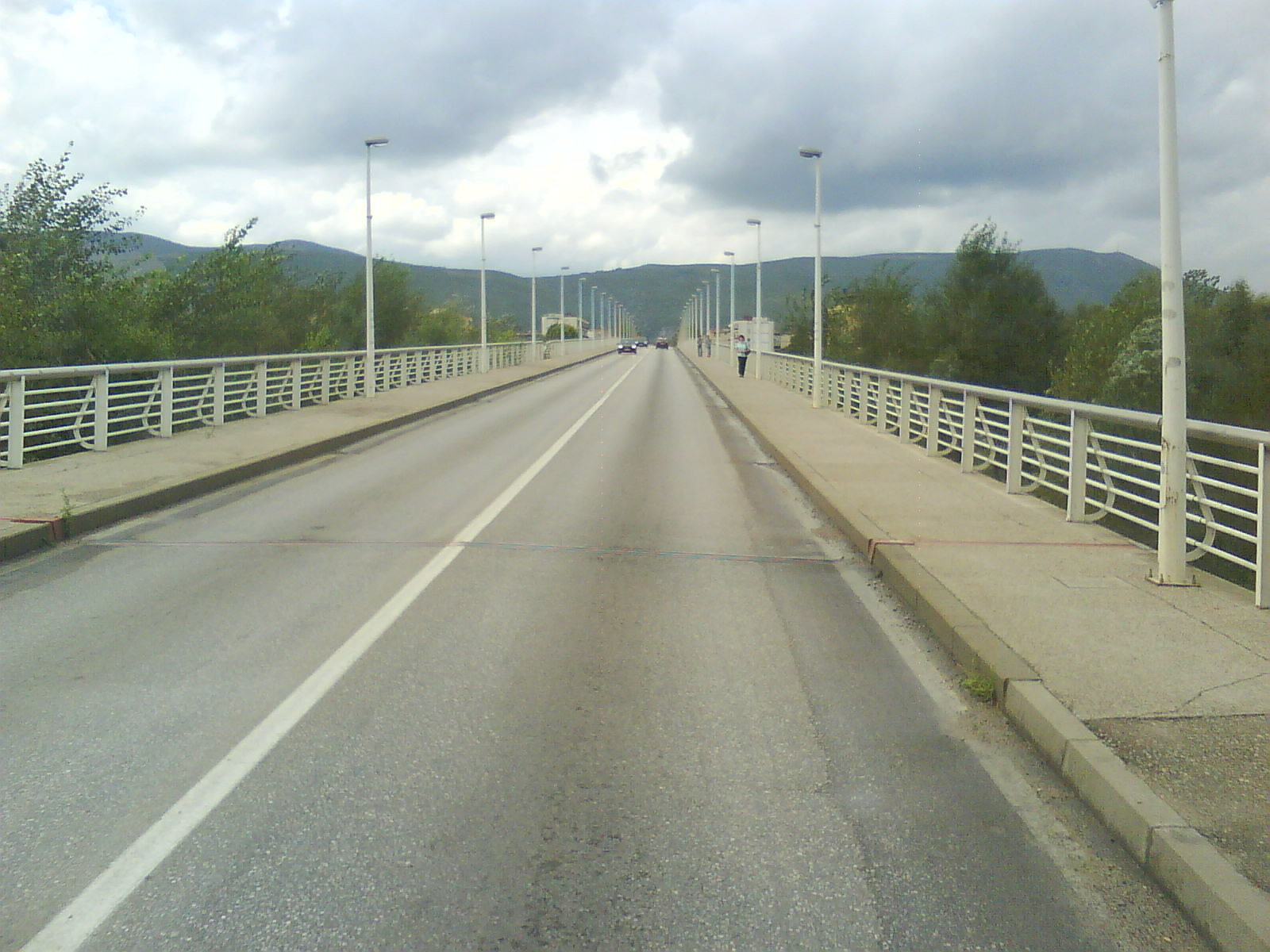
- Franjo Tuđman Bridge
- Coordinates: 43°06′32″N 17°42′24″E
- Carries: 2 traffic lanes, 2 pedestrian lanes
- Crosses: Neretva River
- Locale: Čapljina, Bosnia and Herzegovina
- Official name: Most dr. Franje Tuđmana

Statistics
- Toll: no

Franjo Tuđman Bridge (Croatian: Most dr. Franje Tuđmana) is a bridge over Neretva River located in Čapljina, Bosnia and Herzegovina. It was named after Franjo Tuđman, the first President of Croatia, as are a bridge in Dubrovnik and one in Osijek.
