= Kalić =

Coordinates: 45°30′35″N 14°44′03″E

- Village
- Interactive map of Kalić
- Country: Croatia
- County: Primorje-Gorski Kotar County
- Town: Delnice

Area
  - Total: 4.0 km^{2} (1.5 sq mi)

Population (2021)
  - Total: 0
  - Density: 0.0/km^{2} (0.0/sq mi)
- Time zone: UTC+1 (CET)
  - Summer (DST): UTC+2 (CEST)

Kalić is a village in Croatia. It is connected by the D8 highway.
