= Vir (municipality) =

Municipality in Croatia

- municipality
- Interactive map of Vir
- Location within Croatia
- Coordinates: 44°18′N 15°5′E
- Country: Croatia
- County: Zadar County

Area
  - Total: 22.2 km^{2} (8.6 sq mi)

Population (2021)
  - Total: 3,045
  - Density: 137/km^{2} (355/sq mi)
- Time zone: UTC+1 (CET)
  - Summer (DST): UTC+2 (CEST)
- Postal code: 23234 Vir
- Area code: 023
- Website: vir.hr

Vir is a municipality on the eponymous island of Vir in Zadar County, Croatia. The municipality was established in 1993, incorporating three settlements, that of Lozice, Torovi and Vir, and the islet of Školjčić. Before the independence of Croatia, Vir was administratively part of the former Municipality of Zadar.

== Demographics ==
Municipality of Vir: Population trends 1857–2021
v

| population | 358 | 345 | 503 | 554 | 604 | 662 | 1000 | 854 | 1072 | 1120 | 1069 | 959 | 866 | 860 | 1608 | 3000 | 3045 |
| | 1857 | 1869 | 1880 | 1890 | 1900 | 1910 | 1921 | 1931 | 1948 | 1953 | 1961 | 1971 | 1981 | 1991 | 2001 | 2011 | 2021 |

Sources: Croatian Bureau of Statistics publications

== Politics ==
=== Minority councils and representatives ===
Directly elected minority councils and representatives are tasked with consulting tasks for the local or regional authorities in which they are advocating for minority rights and interests, integration into public life and participation in the management of local affairs. At the 2023 Croatian national minorities councils and representatives elections Bosniaks of Croatia fulfilled legal requirements to elect 10 members minority councils of the Municipality of Vir with 9 members being elected in the end.
