= D223 road =

Road in Croatia

D223 state road

Route information
- Length: 4.6 km (2.9 mi)

Major junctions
- From: Gornji Brgat border crossing to Bosnia and Herzegovina
- To: D8 near Dubrovnik

Location
- Country: Croatia
- Counties: Dubrovnik-Neretva
- Major cities: Dubrovnik

Highway system
- Highways in Croatia

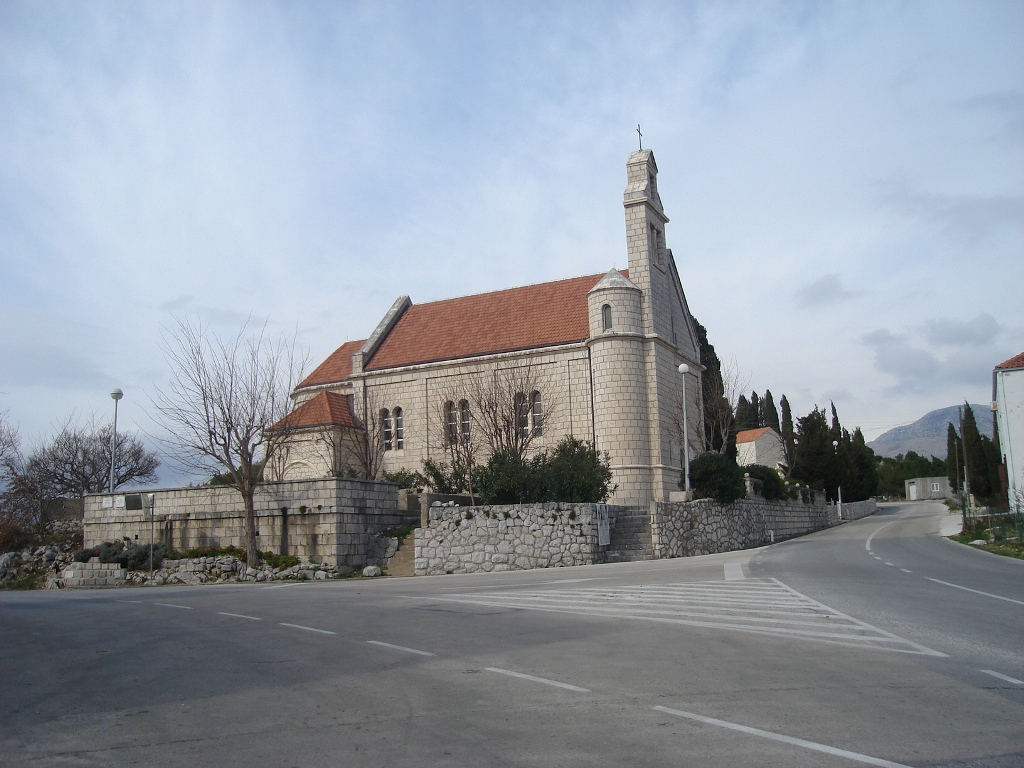
Brgat, on the D223 road route

D223 is a state road in the southern Croatia connecting the Gornji Brgat border crossing to Bosnia and Herzegovina to the D8 state road near Dubrovnik. The road is 4.6 km (2.9 mi) long.

The road and all other state roads in Croatia are managed and maintained by Hrvatske ceste, the state-owned company.

== Road junctions and populated areas ==
D223 junctions/populated areas
Type	Slip roads/Notes
	Gornji Brgat border crossing to Bosnia and Herzegovina. The road extends to Trebinje, in Bosnia and Herzegovina, which is the northern terminus of the road.
	Gornji Brgat
	D8 to Dubrovnik (to the west) and to Cavtat (to the east). The southern terminus of the road.
