= Sustjepan =

- Village
- Interactive map of Sustjepan
- Location within Croatia
- Coordinates: 42°40′12″N 18°05′51″E
- Country: Croatia
- County: Dubrovnik-Neretva County
- Municipality: Dubrovnik

Area
  - Total: 0.54 sq mi (1.4 km^{2})

Population (2021)
  - Total: 301
  - Density: 560/sq mi (220/km^{2})
- Time zone: UTC+1 (CET)
  - Summer (DST): UTC+2 (CEST)

Sustjepan is a village in Croatia, located in the Dubrovnik-Neretva County.

== Demographics ==
According to the 2021 census, its population was 301.
