= D425 road =

Road in Croatia

D425 state road

Route information
- Length: 9.87 km (6.13 mi)

Major junctions
- From: A1 connector at Karamatići toll station
- D8 near Ploče
- To: D413 near Ploče

Location
- Country: Croatia
- Counties: Dubrovnik-Neretva

Highway system
- Highways in Croatia

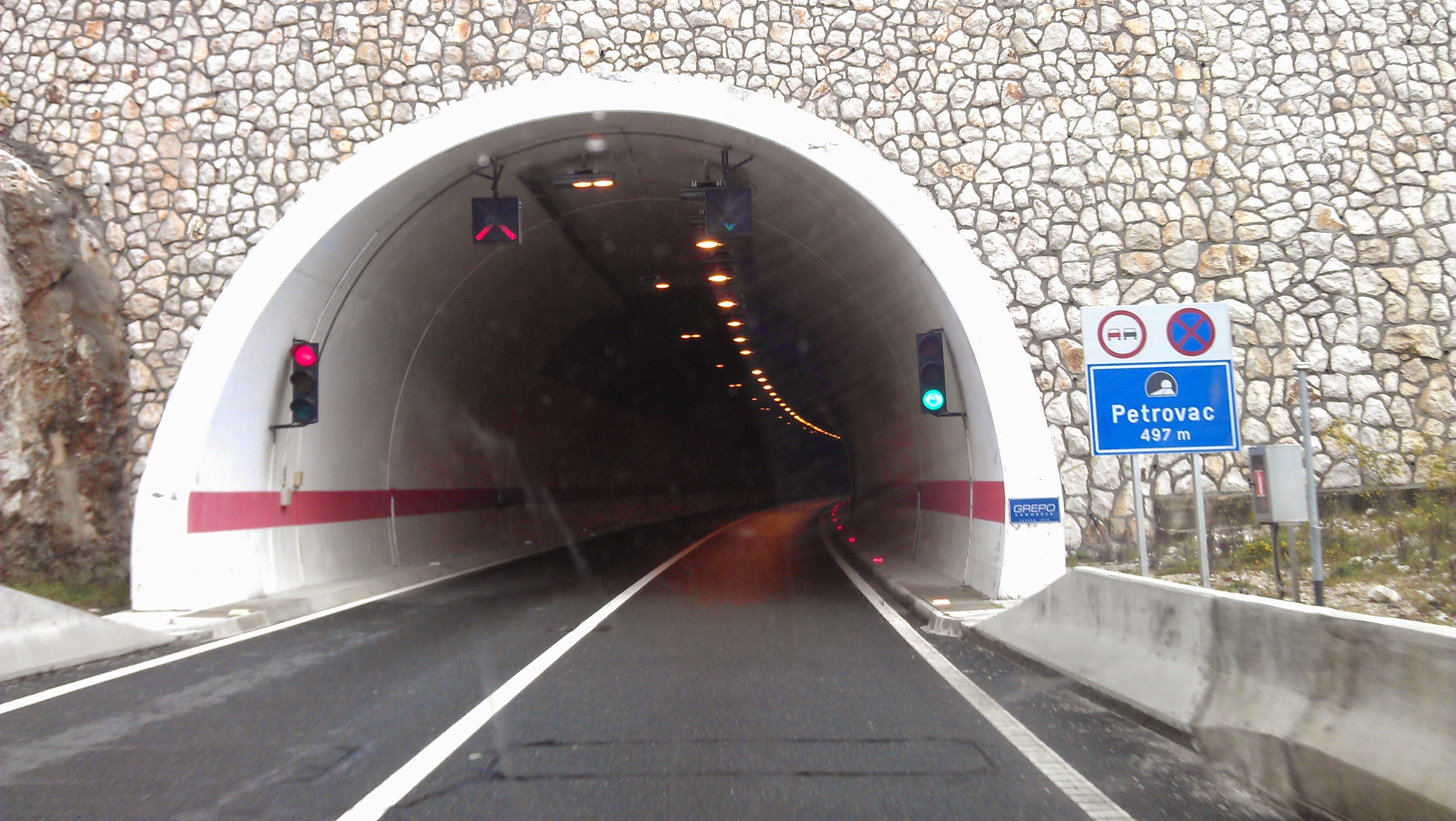
Petrovac tunnel on D425

D425 is a state road in Croatia, connecting the outskirts of Ploče with the A1 motorway connector at the Karamatići toll station. Its main purpose is a connection from the motorway to the Port of Ploče. The road is 9.87 km (6.13 mi) long.

The road, as well as all other state roads in Croatia, is managed and maintained by Hrvatske ceste, a state-owned company.

== History ==
The road was initially built as a single connector route between the A1 and the Port of Ploče, at the time designated as part of A10. The dual carriageway part of the route was built in two phases, the first between finished in December 2008, and the second in December 2013. The dual carriageway extends from Karamatići to the Radonjić Viaduct.

Under the current official road classification, as of 2016, the D425 ends at the toll station, while the continuation of the road to the north, a 6.6 km (4.1 mi) expressway connector from the Karamatići toll plaza to the A1 Ploče interchange, is not classified as part of the D425. It is instead tolled as part of the A1 system, and it includes the Mali Prolog viaduct (278m), the Mali Prolog tunnel (1029/1092m), the Kobiljača tunnel (769m), the Brečići-Struge viaduct (598m), the Puljani tunnel (320m), and the Kula viaduct (448m).

== Traffic volume ==
Road traffic in Croatia is regularly counted and reported by Hrvatske ceste, the operator of the road. The traffic entering D425 specifically is counted by Croatian Motorways Ltd at the Karamatići entrance.

Substantial variations between annual (AADT) and summer (ASDT) traffic volumes are attributed to the fact that the road serves as a connection to the A1 motorway and the D8 state road carrying substantial tourist traffic.

D425 traffic volume
Road	Counting site	AADT	ASDT	Notes
D425	6031 Karamatići	2,060	4,204	As of 2019. At the Karamatići toll plaza.

== Road junctions and populated areas ==
D425 junctions/populated areas
Type	Slip roads/Notes
Toll plaza symbol	Karamatići toll plaza to the A1 connector. The northern terminus of the road.
	Zmijarevići Tunnel; Two tube, four-lane tunnel. The tunnel tubes are 200 m (660 ft) and 400 m (1,300 ft) long respectively.
	Ploče rest area
	Radonjić Viaduct; Four lane viaduct, executed as two parallel structures. The structures are 288 m (945 ft) and 310 m (1,020 ft) long respectively.
	The southern terminus of the dual carriageway expressway.
	Dračevac 1 Viaduct; Two-lane viaduct, 329 m (1,079 ft) long.
	Dračevac 2 Viaduct; The viaduct is 196 m (643 ft) long.
	Vrila Viaduct; The viaduct is 253 m (830 ft) long.
	Petrovac Tunnel; The tunnel is 497 m (1,631 ft) long.
	Međak Tunnel; The tunnel is 341 m (1,119 ft) long. It has a single tube but is three lanes wide.
	Čeveljuša interchange with D8 to Baćina (to the west) and to Rogotin and Opuzen (to the east). Interchange incorporates the Crna Rijeka bridge which has three lanes and is 328 m (1,076 ft) long.
	The Port of Ploče with D413 to Ploče (to the north). The southern terminus of the road.
