= Bakarac =

- Village
- Location within Croatia
- Coordinates: 45.279869°N 14.581475°E
- Country: Croatia
- Region: Croatian Littoral
- County: Primorje-Gorski Kotar County
- City: Kraljevica

Area
  - Total: 0.62 sq mi (1.6 km^{2})
- Elevation: 9.8 ft (3 m)

Population (2021)
  - Total: 287
  - Density: 460/sq mi (180/km^{2})
- Time zone: UTC+1 (CET)
  - Summer (DST): UTC+2 (CEST)
- Postal code: 51261
- Area code: 051

Bakarac (Italian: Buccarizza) is a village in Bay of Bakar, Croatia. The settlement is administered as a part of the City of Kraljevica and Primorje-Gorski Kotar County. According to the 2001 census, it has 307 inhabitants. It is connected by the D8 state road.

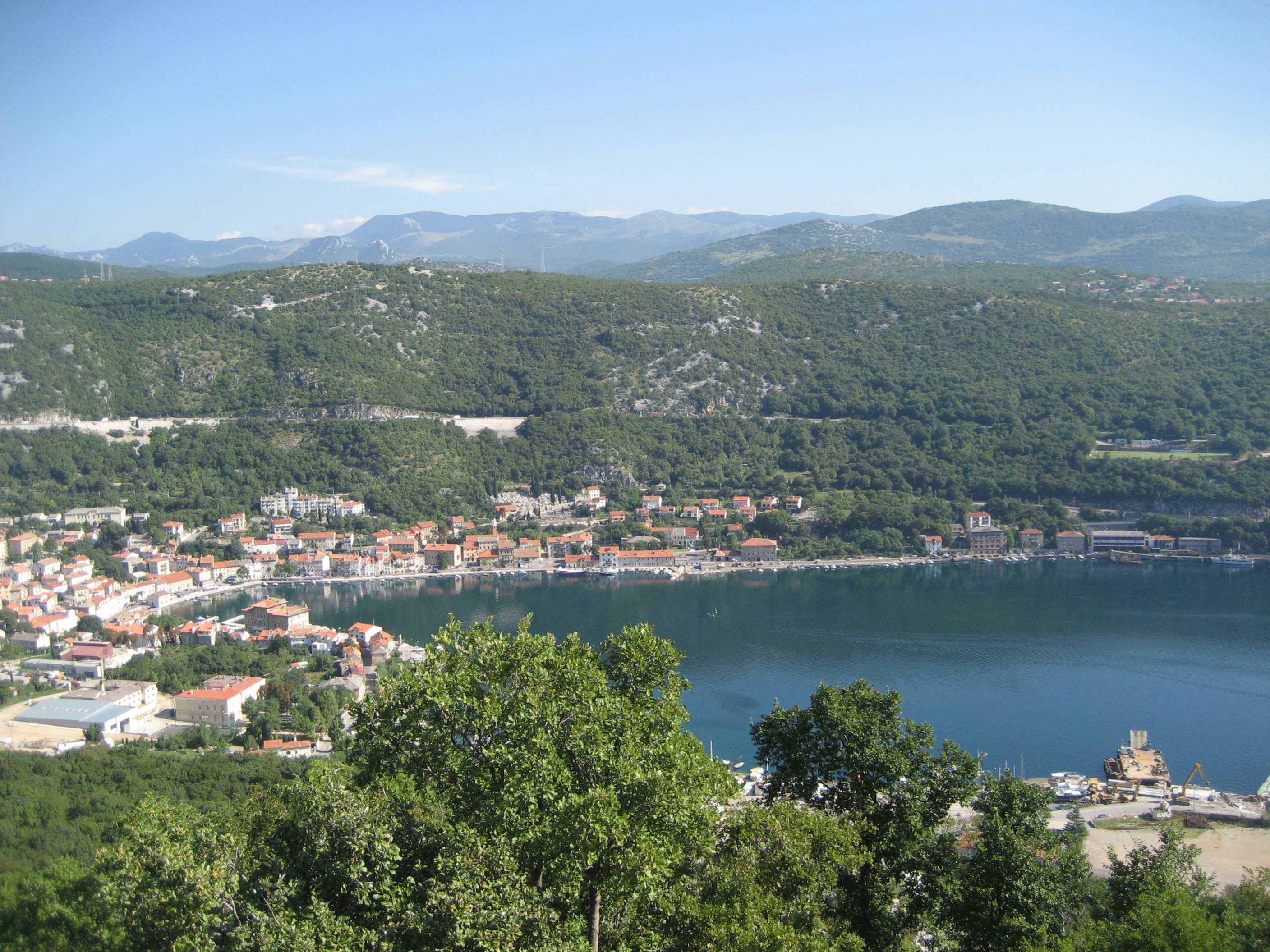
Bakarac

== Demographics ==
In 1895, the obćina of Bakarac (court at Bakarac), with an area of 6.1278 square kilometres (2.3660 mi^{2}), belonged to the kotar of Sušak (Bakar court and electoral district) in the županija of Modruš-Rieka (Ogulin court and financial board). There were 299 houses, with a population of 1323 (lowest in Sušak kotar). Its 5 villages were divided for taxation purposes into 2 porezne obćine, under the Bakar office.

== Governance ==
=== Local ===
It is the seat of its own local committee.
