= Vir (island) =

Island in Croatia

Coordinates: 44°18.20568′N 15°05.13222′E

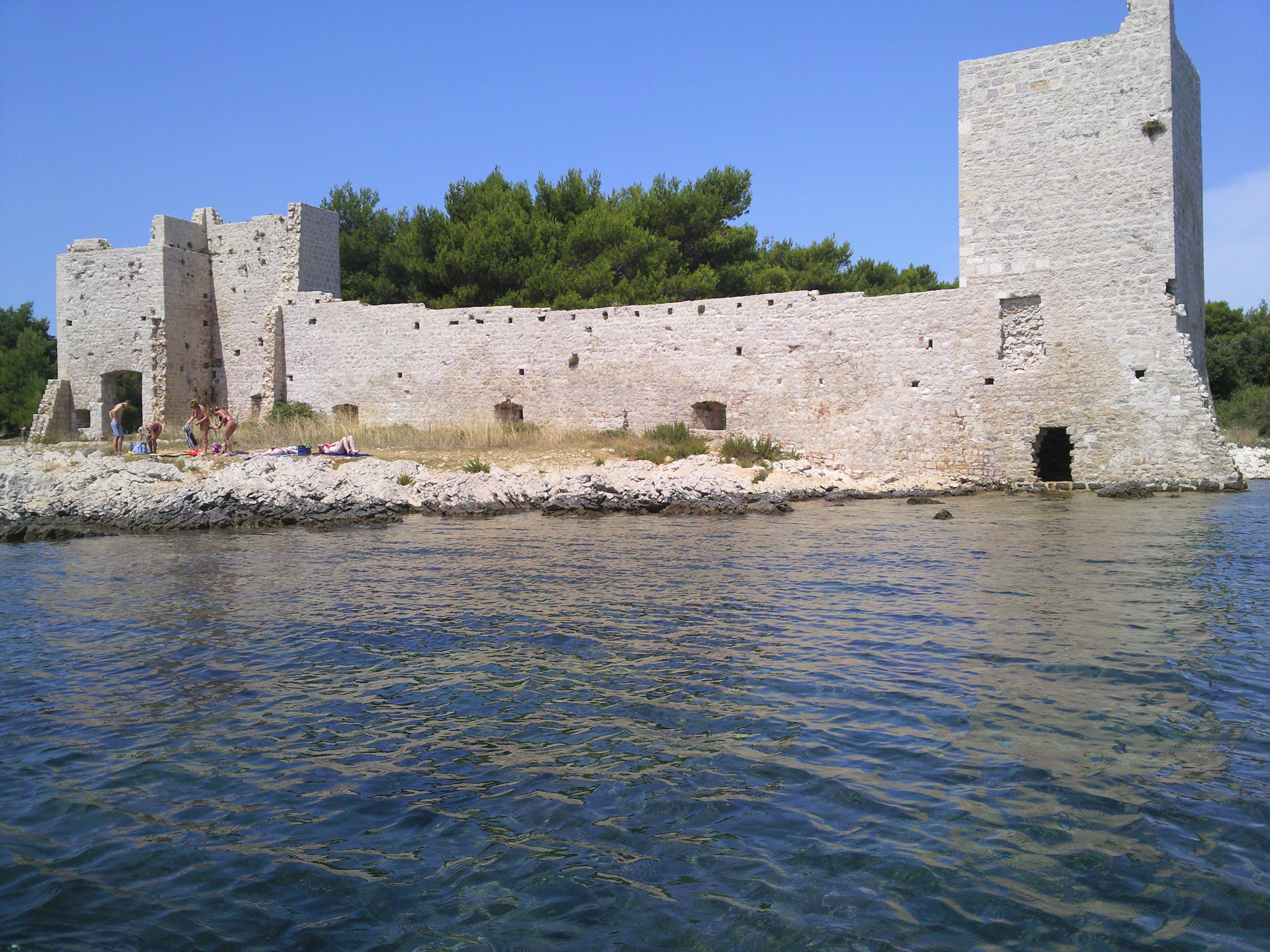
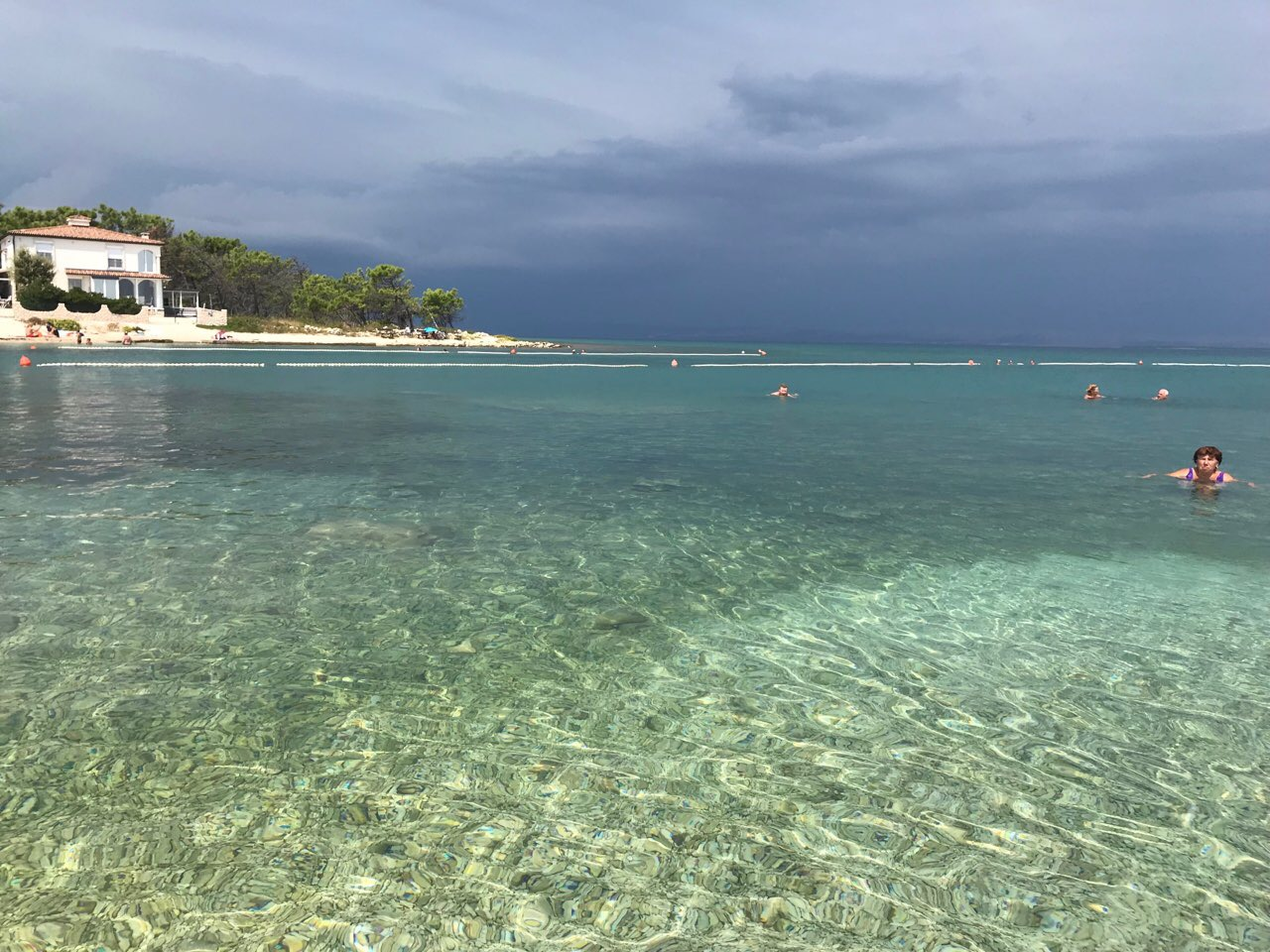
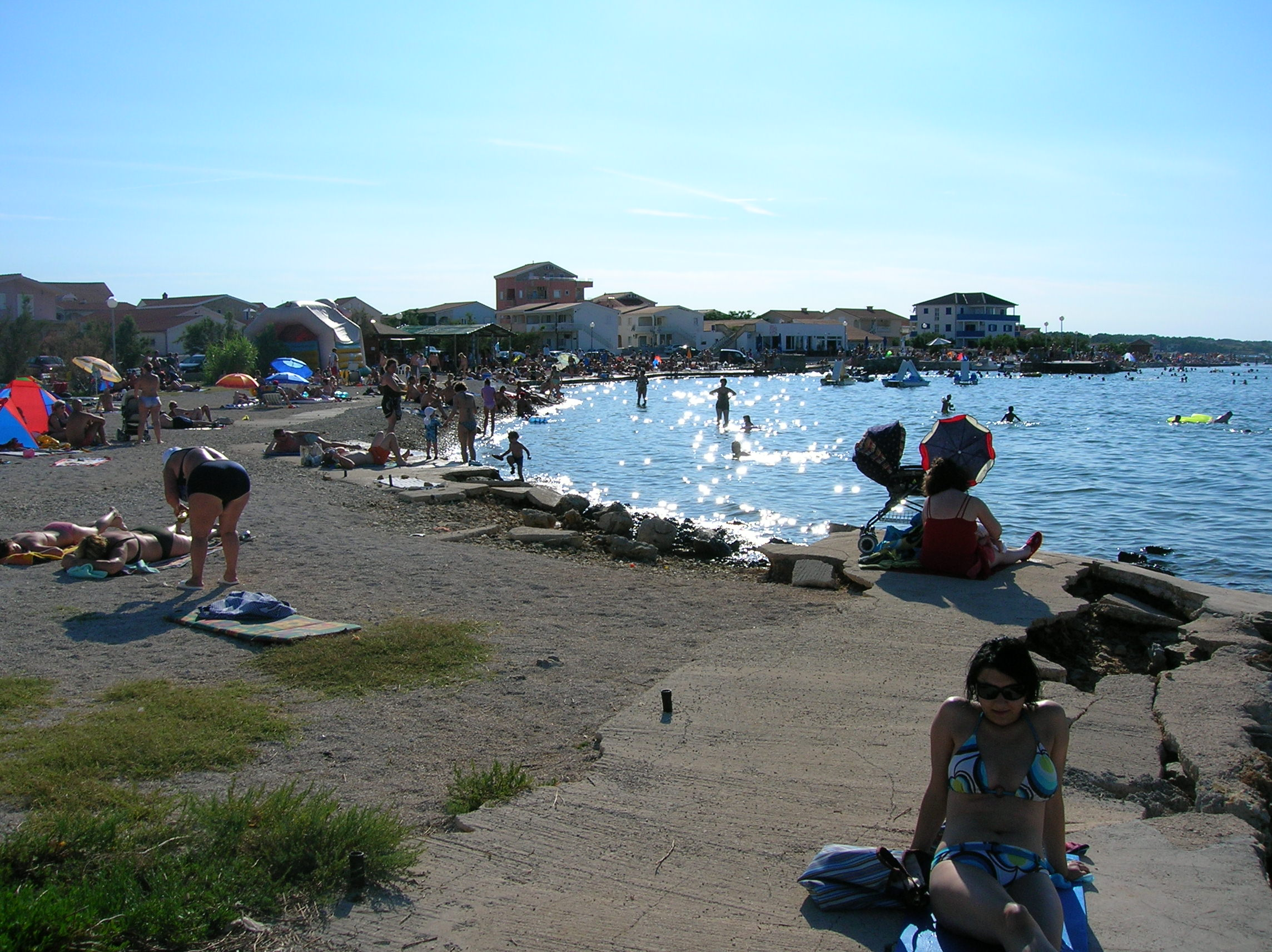
- Kaštelina castle Red beach Lighthouse on Vir Beach on the coastline Bridge connecting Vir with mainland Archeological excavations in Smratine Tourists at Lučica beach
- Interactive map of Vir

Geography
- Location: Adriatic Sea
- Area: 22.38 km^{2} (8.64 sq mi)
- Highest elevation: 112 m (367 ft)
- Highest point: Bandira

Administration
- Croatia
- County: Zadar County
- Largest settlement: Vir

Demographics
- Population: 3,045 (2021)
- Pop. density: 136/km^{2} (352/sq mi)

Vir (pronounced [v̞îːr]) is an island on the Croatian coast of the Adriatic Sea with an area of 22 km^{2}. It lies in Dalmatia, north of the city of Zadar. It is connected to the mainland via a road bridge. The main village on the island is the eponymous village of Vir. There are two more villages, Lozice and Torovi. According to the 2011 census, the island had a population of 3,000 inhabitants, making it the 13th most populous island in Croatia.

The highest peak on the island is Bandira (112 m).

== History ==
The first known mention of Vir was in Mare Nostrum Dalmaticum (1069), a charter by Croatian king Peter Krešimir IV, where the island is referred to as Ueru (Veru), a word believed to have an ancient Mediterranean origin, meaning "pasture". As part of the Pacta conventa in 1102, defining the status of Croatia in personal union with Hungary, Vir and the area became a part of a union with the Kingdom of Hungary. During the 1241 Mongol invasion of Europe, the Hungarian King Béla IV of Hungary fled to the south, and the Mongol forces under the leadership of Kadan followed him all the way to Dalmatia, where they were repelled by the Croatian forces. Afterwards, Hungarian rule was quickly restored back to normal. In 1313, the Republic of Venice sent three thousand soldiers to the island, claiming it, and used it as a base to attack and conquer the nearby city of Zadar. This marks the new era of the reign of Venice over the area.

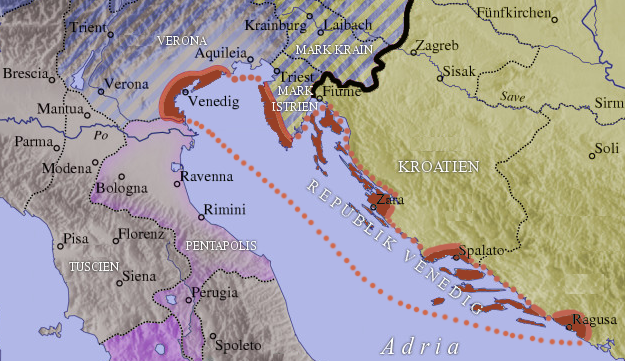
Vir as part of the Republic of Venice in the 14th century

In the 16th century, the Ottoman conquest of Europe started to threaten the Dalmatian coast, causing Venice to build the Kaštelina fortress as a precaution in case of an Ottoman invasion. Local documents indicate that 36 people lived on Vir in 1579, and 130 people by 1603. During the Napoleonic Wars, Napoleon's army established the Illyrian Provinces over large swaths of Dalmatia, including Vir, as part of a direct rule of the First French Empire from 1809 to 1814. Following the defeat of the French forces, the area became part of the Austrian Empire, in 1867 reformed into Austria-Hungary. Following the dissolution of Austria-Hungary after World War I, Vir became part of the Kingdom of Yugoslavia, while the neighboring Zadar was left as an enclave of the Kingdom of Italy. In 1941, Fascist Italy ruled by Benito Mussolini conquered the rest of Dalmatia, while Vir was under the control of the Nazi puppet state of Independent State of Croatia. After World War II, Tito's Partisan forces expelled Italian forces and incorporated Zadar and Vir into the newly formed Socialist Federal Republic of Yugoslavia by 1945. Following the dissolution of Yugoslavia, Croatia declared independence from Yugoslavia, and the Croatian War of Independence escalated in 1991. The Serb and Yugoslav forces mounted an attack on the Zadar area, but were stopped. Vir became a part of the newly sovereign Croatia and was mostly untouched by the war, which ended in 1995.

== Tourism ==
Vir is a tourist hotspot. Official statistics in 2018 documented over 80,000 guests from over 70 countries on the island already by the end of July. In 2018, the highest number of foreign tourists was from Slovenia, Germany, Hungary, Slovakia, the Czech Republic, Bosnia and Herzegovina, Poland, Austria, Sweden and Switzerland. With an average of 12.6 overnight stays per tourist, Vir holds the record of the longest time of tourist stays in Croatia.

== Overpopulation ==
The island is one of the biggest described endemic places of origin of house-mouse-borne lymphocytic choriomeningitis in the world, with IFA testing having found LCMV antibodies in 36% of the tested population.

== Bibliography ==
=== Name ===
- Šenoa, Milan (1949). "Prilog poznavanju starih naziva naših otoka" [A Contribution to Learning the Old Names of Our Islands]. Hrvatski geografski glasnik (in Serbo-Croatian) (11–12) (published 1950-06-15): 75–82. ISSN 1331-5854.

=== Climate ===
- Lozić, Sanja; Radoš, Denis (2016). "Klimatske značajke otoka Vira". Otok Vir [Climate features of the Vir Island] (in Serbo-Croatian). Zadar: Sveučilište u Zadru, Općina Vir. pp. 61–79. ISBN 978-953-331-107-4.
