= Gruž =

Neighborhood in Dubrovnik, Croatia

Coordinates: 42°39′33″N 18°05′06″E

- District of Dubrovnik
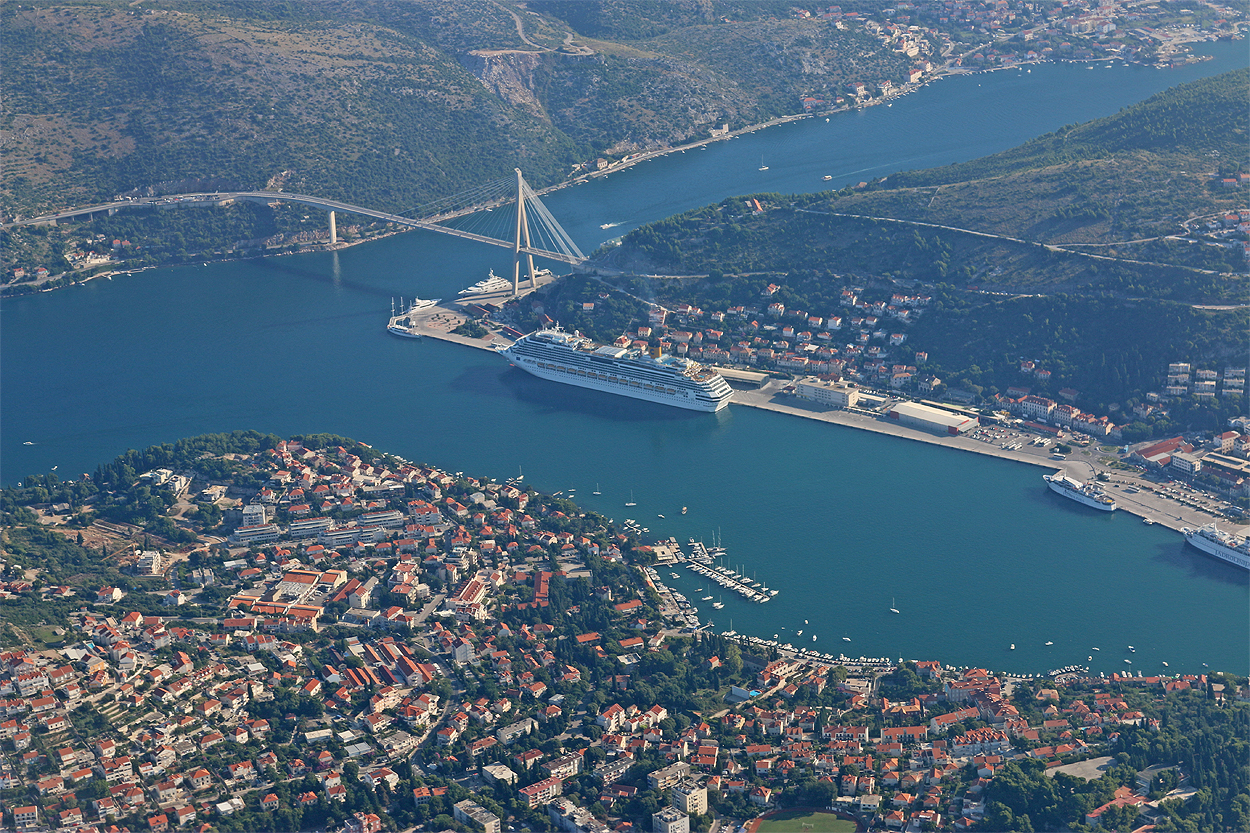
- Aerial view of neighbourhood of Gruž
- Interactive map of Gruž
- Country: Croatia
- County: Dubrovnik-Neretva

Population (2022)
  - Total: 15,000

Gruž (Italian: Gravosa - Santa Croce) is a neighbourhood in Dubrovnik, Croatia, about 2 km northwest of the Old City. It has a population of approximately 15,000 people. The main port for Dubrovnik is in Gruž as well as its largest market and the main bus station "Libertas". While historically a manufacturing and industrial base for Dubrovnik, today it is one of the city's main residential areas along with Lapad and Mokošica.

From the 13th century and greatly through the 16th, Gruž was a separate town from Dubrovnik that provided a summer retreat for the inhabitants of the Republic of Ragusa. The shores, like those of Ombla, are populated with a great many stone homes and former summer palaces that are surrounded by cultivated grounds.

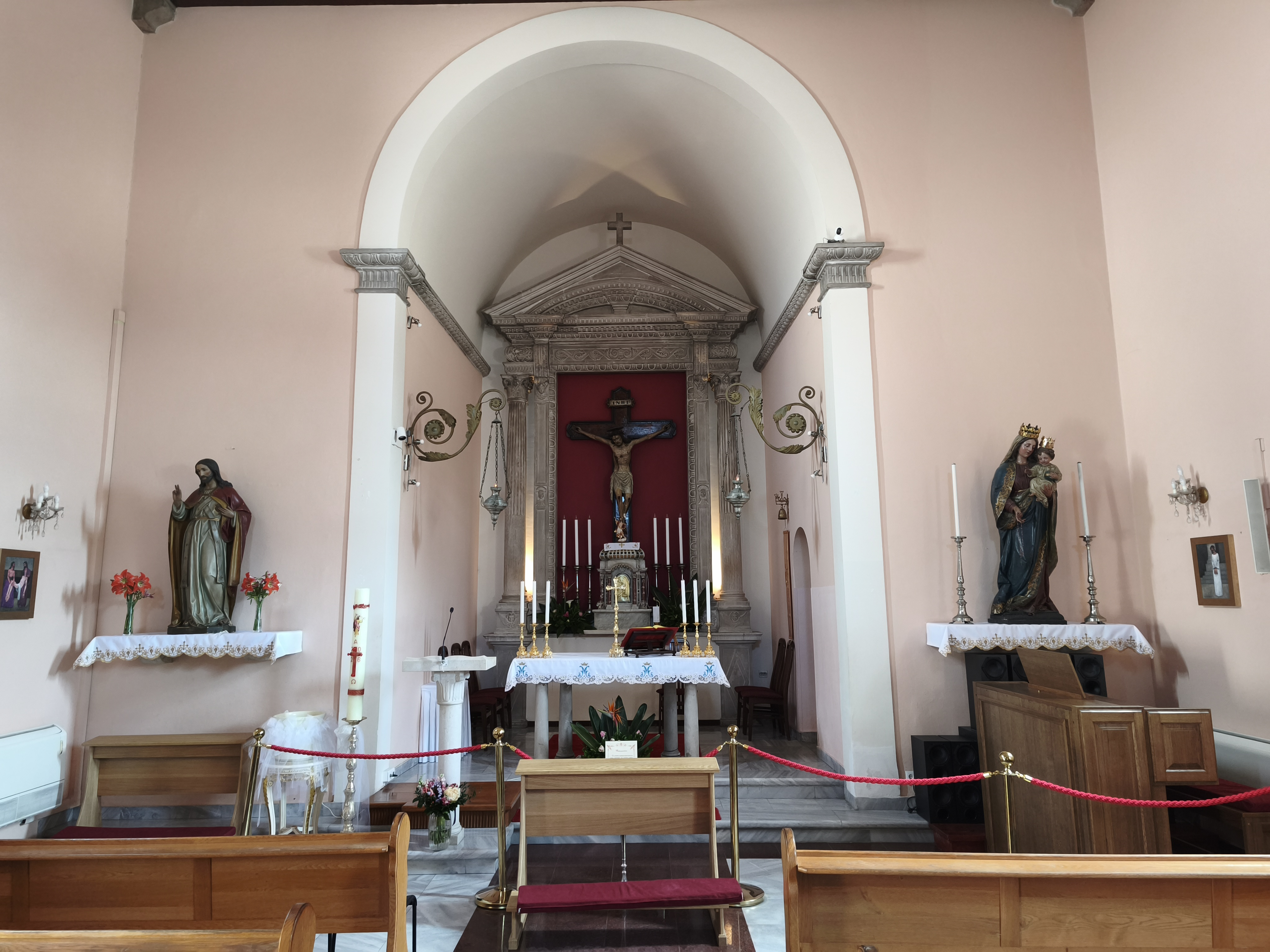
Interior of Dominican monastery and Church of Holy Cross in Gruž, from 1437

Starting in December, 1910, Gruž was the terminus point for the now defunct Dubrovnik tram that ceased running in 1970 following a deadly accident where the tram slipped off its rails and landed in the park in front of Pile Gate. The line has since been replaced by bus routes. Located in a naturally protected bay, the port was used an Austro-Hungarian naval facility until the end of 1918 and today is able to accommodate large passenger cruise ships. Ferries run from the port to the Elaphiti Islands and Mljet regularly.

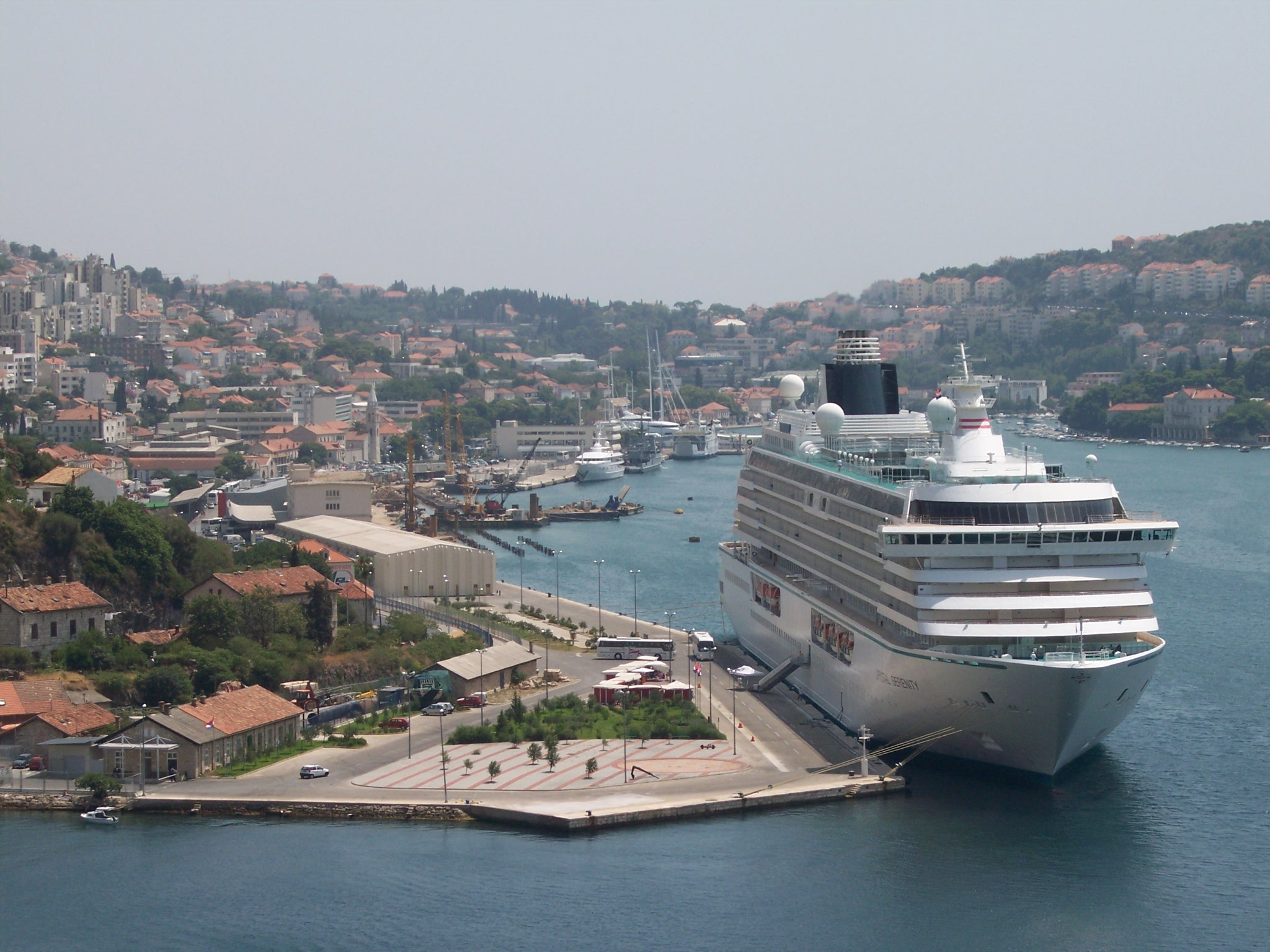
Dubrovnik passenger port terminal

There is also a customs building for ferries that are international arrivals, specifically from Bari.

Gruž sits right at the entrance to Port Ombla. It is directly across the water from Cantafigo point, which lacks anchorage points due to the shores and the bottom of the inlet being immersed by banks of mud, deposited during heavy rains. Vessels belonging to Dubrovnik spend their winters at Gruž. Violent squalls descend from the highlands bringing the cold, northerly bora, but the waters in the bay of Gruž remain calm.

On May 12th, 2026, a memorial for 15 children killed in the Siege of Dubrovnik (1991-92) was opened.
