= Franjo Tuđman Bridge (Osijek) =

Bridge in Osijek, Croatia

Franjo Tuđman Bridge Most dr. Franje Tuđmana
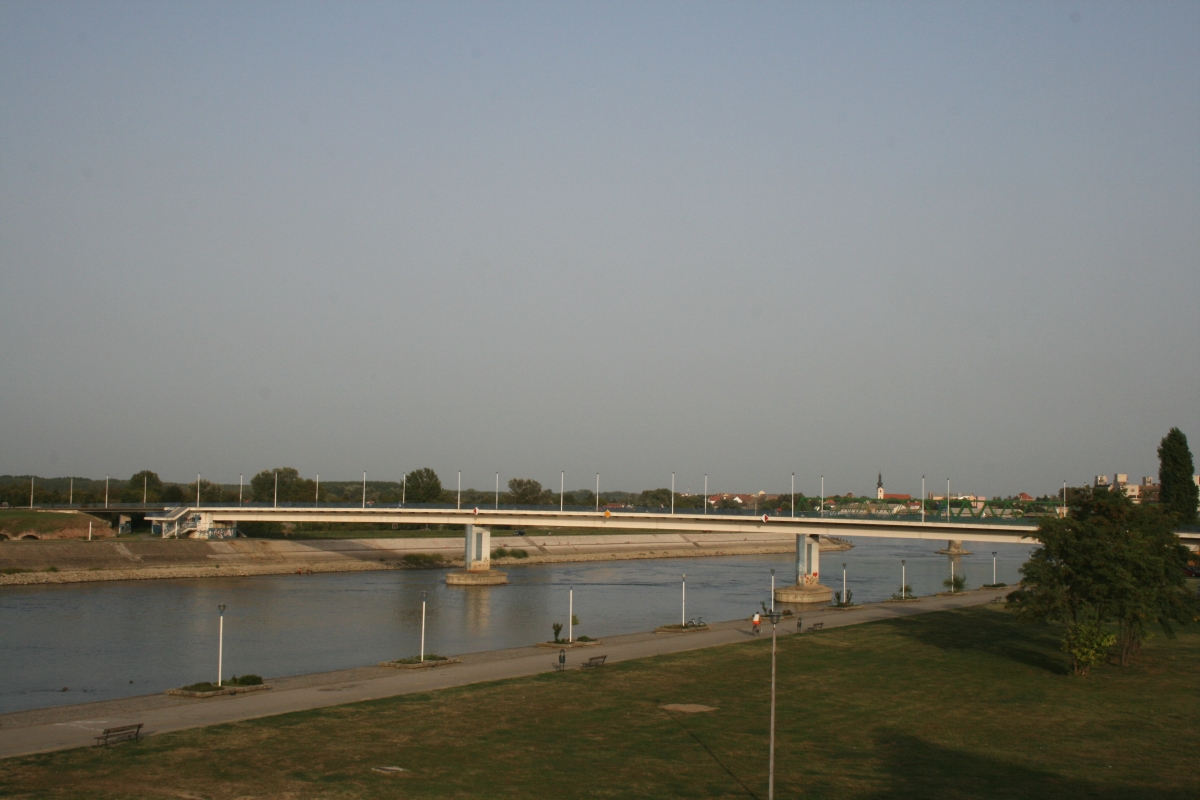
- Franjo Tuđman Bridge from Tvrđa
- Coordinates: 45°33′44″N 18°42′05″E
- Carries: 2 traffic lanes, 2 pedestrian lanes
- Crosses: Drava River
- Locale: Osijek, Croatia
- Maintained by: Hrvatske ceste
- Preceded by: Pedestrian bridge
- Followed by: Railway bridge

Characteristics
- Total length: 294 m (965 ft)
- Piers in water: 2

History
- Construction start: 1993
- Construction end: 1995
- Inaugurated: 10 June 1995; 29 years ago

Statistics
- Toll: no

The Franjo Tuđman Bridge (Croatian: Most dr. Franje Tuđmana) is a 294-meter-long (965 ft) bridge over Drava River located in Osijek, Croatia. It connects Osijek and Slavonia with Baranja.

== History ==
In 1962 a vehicular bridge over Drava River was built in Osijek. It was in use until 1991 when it was demolished in the Croatian War of Independence, battle of Osijek.

In 1993 the cornerstone was laid for a new bridge. The initiator of this project was Croatian President Franjo Tuđman. The new bridge was finished in 1995, in place of old bridge. The opening ceremony was on 10 June 1995, with president Tuđman in attendance.

From 1995 since 2009 bridge had a few names, for example Drava Bridge (Croatian: Dravski most) or Bilje Bridge (Croatian: Biljski most). In 2009, by decision of the leaderships of Osijek and Osijek-Baranja County, the bridge was renamed Franjo Tuđman Bridge. In 2012 bridge was renovated.
