= List of E-roads in Croatia =

European routes in Croatia

System information
- Maintained by Hrvatske autoceste Hrvatske ceste BINA Istra; Autocesta Zagreb–Macelj
- Length: 2,264 km (1,407 mi)

Highway names
- European routes: European route E nn (E nn)

System links
- Highways in Croatia

This is a list of the European Routes, or E-road highways, that run through the Croatia. The current network is signposted according to the 2016 system revision, and contains seven Class A roads and three Class B roads within the country.

Most of the roads are motorways that also carry various national A-numbers (for Autocesta), and there are several state roads with D-numbers (for Državna cesta).

== Class-A European routes ==
Number	Length	Northern or western terminus	Southern or eastern terminus	Route
E59	61 km (38 mi)	Slovenian border near Macelj	A3 (E70) in Zagreb	A2: Macelj - Zagreb
E61	33 km (21 mi)	Slovenian border near Pasjak	A6 (E65) in Rijeka	D8: Pasjak- Rupa; A7: Rupa - Rijeka
E65	757 km (470 mi)	Hungarian border near Goričan	Bosnian-Herzegovinian border near Klek	A4: Goričan - Zagreb; A3: Zagreb bypass A1: Zagreb - Bosiljevo; A6: Bosiljevo - Rijeka; A7: Rijeka - Sveti Kuzam D40: Sveti Kuzam - Bakar D8: Bakar - Senj D23: Senj - Žuta Lokva; A1: Žuta Lokva - Mali Prolog D425: Mali Prolog - Ploče D8: Ploče - Klek
E65	94 km (58 mi)	Bosnian-Herzegovinian border near Zaton Doli	Montenegrin border near Karasovići	D8: Zaton Doli - Karasovići
E70	305 km (190 mi)	Slovenian border near Bregana	Serbian border near Lipovac	A3: Bregana - Lipovac
E71	510 km (320 mi)	Hungarian border near Goričan	D8 in Split	A4: Goričan - Zagreb; A3: Zagreb bypass A1: Zagreb - Dugopolje D1: Dugopolje - Split
E73	143 km (89 mi)	Hungarian border near Duboševica	Bosnian-Herzegovinian border near Slavonski Šamac	D7: Duboševica - Osijek D2: Osijek bypass A5: Osijek - Sredanci; A3: Sredanci - Velika Kopanica D7: Velika Kopanica - Slavonski Šamac
E73	11 km (6.8 mi)	Bosnian-Herzegovinian border near Metković	D8 in Opuzen	D9: Metković - Opuzen
E80	39 km (24 mi)	Ferry port in Dubrovnik	Montenegrin border near Karasovići	D8: Dubrovnik - Karasovići

== Class-B European routes ==
Number	Length	Northern or western terminus	Southern or eastern terminus	Route
E661	123 km (76 mi)	Hungarian border near Terezino Polje	Bosnian-Herzegovinian border near Stara Gradiška	D5: Terezino Polje - Stara Gradiška
E662	44 km (27 mi)	Serbian border near Batina	D2 (E73) in Osijek	D212: Batina - Karanac D7: Karanac - Osijek
E751	117 km (73 mi)	A7 (E61) in Matulji	Slovenian border near Kaštel	A8: Matulji - Kanfanar; A9: Kanfanar - Kaštel
E751	27 km (17 mi)	A8 in Kanfanar	D66 in Pula	A9: Kanfanar - Pula

== See also ==
- Highways in Croatia
- Roads in Croatia
- Ministry of Maritime Affairs, Transport and Infrastructure
- Hrvatske autoceste
- Hrvatske ceste
