= Adriatic–Ionian motorway =

Future road in Europe

Adriatic–Ionian Motorway
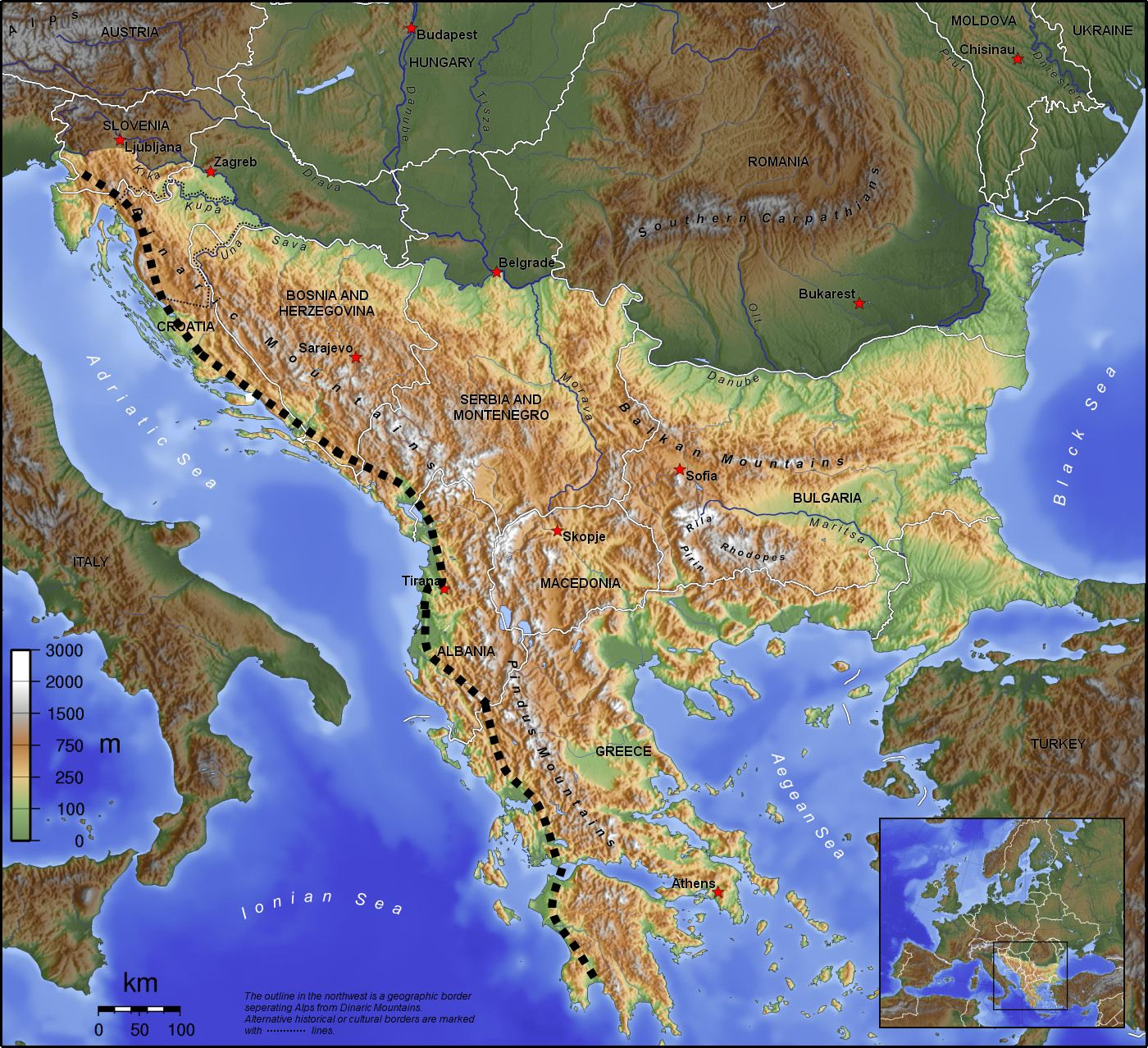

Major junctions
- From: Trieste, Italy
- To: Kalamata, Greece

Location
- Countries: Italy, Slovenia, Croatia, Bosnia and Herzegovina, Montenegro, Albania, Greece
- Major cities: Trieste, Rijeka, Split, Dubrovnik, Podgorica, Shkodër, Tirana, Gjirokastër, Ioannina, Patras, Kalamata

Highway system
- International E-road network; A Class; B Class

Adriatic–Ionian motorway (Albanian: Autostrada Adriatiko-Joniane; Bosnian and Croatian: Jadransko-jonska autocesta; Montenegrin and Serbian: Jadransko-jonski autoput / Јадранско-јонски аутопут; Greek: Aftokinitodromos Adriatikis-Ioniou; Italian: Autostrada Adriatico-Ionica) or the Blue Corridor, is a future motorway that will stretch along the entire eastern shore of the Adriatic and Ionian seas, spanning the western coast of the Balkan Peninsula from Italy in the north through Slovenia, Croatia, Montenegro, Albania to Greece in the south.

== Overview ==
The road is planned to be built to full motorway standards. It will start in Trieste, Italy, pass through Slovenia, enter Croatia near Rijeka, and continue through Croatia as part of A1 motorway. The road will be connected to Montenegro through Croatia if via Pelješac Bridge. Passing Ulcinj, the motorway will enter Albania south of Lake Skadar, and continue south, passing Shkodër, Tirana, Rrogozhinë, Fier and Gjirokastër. Exiting Albania, the motorway will follow the A5 motorway in Greece, ending at Kalamata.

The road is seen as a matter of national importance to Croatia, Montenegro and Albania. Those countries have launched an initiative to list the motorway with Pan-European corridors in order to be able to secure foreign funding.

=== Italy ===
With starting of Adriatic–Ionian motorway at Trieste, the already existing feeder road RA 13 to the Slovenian border is used. The RA 13 is connected to the Slovenian A3 highway.

=== Slovenia ===
The Slovenian section starts with the already existing A3 from the Italian border at Sežana to the interconnection with the A1. The further route is not planned yet, but will lead to the Croatian border near Jelšane where it will be connected with the Croatian A7 highway. Until construction of that part, the traffic is passed over a national road.

=== Croatia ===
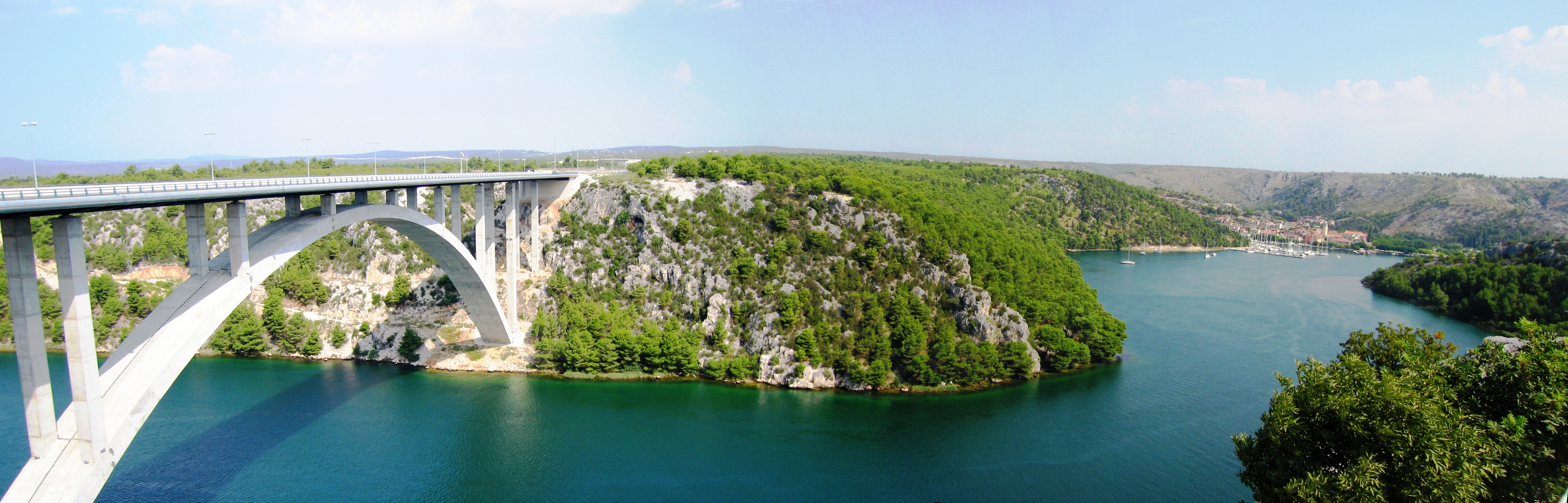
Krka River Bridge carrying the A1 motorway south of Skradin, in immediate vicinity of Krka National Park

In Croatia, the Adriatic–Ionian motorway is planned to follow routes of the A7 motorway along its entire length, and the A1 motorway from the Žuta Lokva interchange to the Border crossing Nova Sela.

So far, Croatia has made the biggest progress on its section by completing significant parts of the A7 motorway and the A1 motorway.

The A7 is completed from the Slovenian border at Rupa, bypassing Rijeka and connecting to the A6. Construction of the part from this junction to a planned interchange with the A1 at Žuta Lokva is currently slowed down and planned as a long-term project. Until completion of this sector, the traffic may either use an indirect route to the A1 via the A6 motorway (to the junction of the A1 and A6 motorways at Bosiljevo 2 interchange) or a more direct route to the A1 via the D8 state road (also known as Adriatic Highway).

Adriatic–Ionian motorway follows the route of the A1 motorway from the Žuta Lokva interchange to the Border crossing Nova Sela where it connects to the A1 motorway in Bosnia and Herzegovina.

Route
Road	Section	Length	Status
A7	border with Slovenia / Rupa - Matulji	16 km	completed
A7	Matulji - Orehovica	12 km	completed (cca 135 km from Orehovica taking the existing motorway A6/A1 via Bosiljevo to Žuta Lokva)
A7	Orehovica - Sveti Kuzam - Križišće	14 km	completed
A7	Križišće - Jadranovo	5.2 km	under construction as completed in 2029
A7	Jadranovo - Selce (Novi Vinodolski)	12.3 km	competition for construction underway
A7	Novi Vinodolski bypass	6.5 km	under construction as two-lane road; in future to be upgraded on four-lane
A7	Novi Vinodolski - Senj	21 km	design started in 2023
A7	Senj - Žuta Lokva	10.8 km	planned
A1	Žuta Lokva - Sveti Rok - Zadar	137 km	completed
A1	Zadar - Šibenik - Split	115 km	completed
A1	Split - Makarska - Ploče	100 km	completed
A1	Ploče - Nova Sela	8 km	completed

=== Bosnia and Herzegovina ===
It has not yet been defined whether a motorway will pass through southern Bosnia and Herzegovina near Trebinje. A route passing through the Trebinje field would require approval of both the Herzegovina-Neretva Canton and Republika Srpska.

=== Montenegro ===
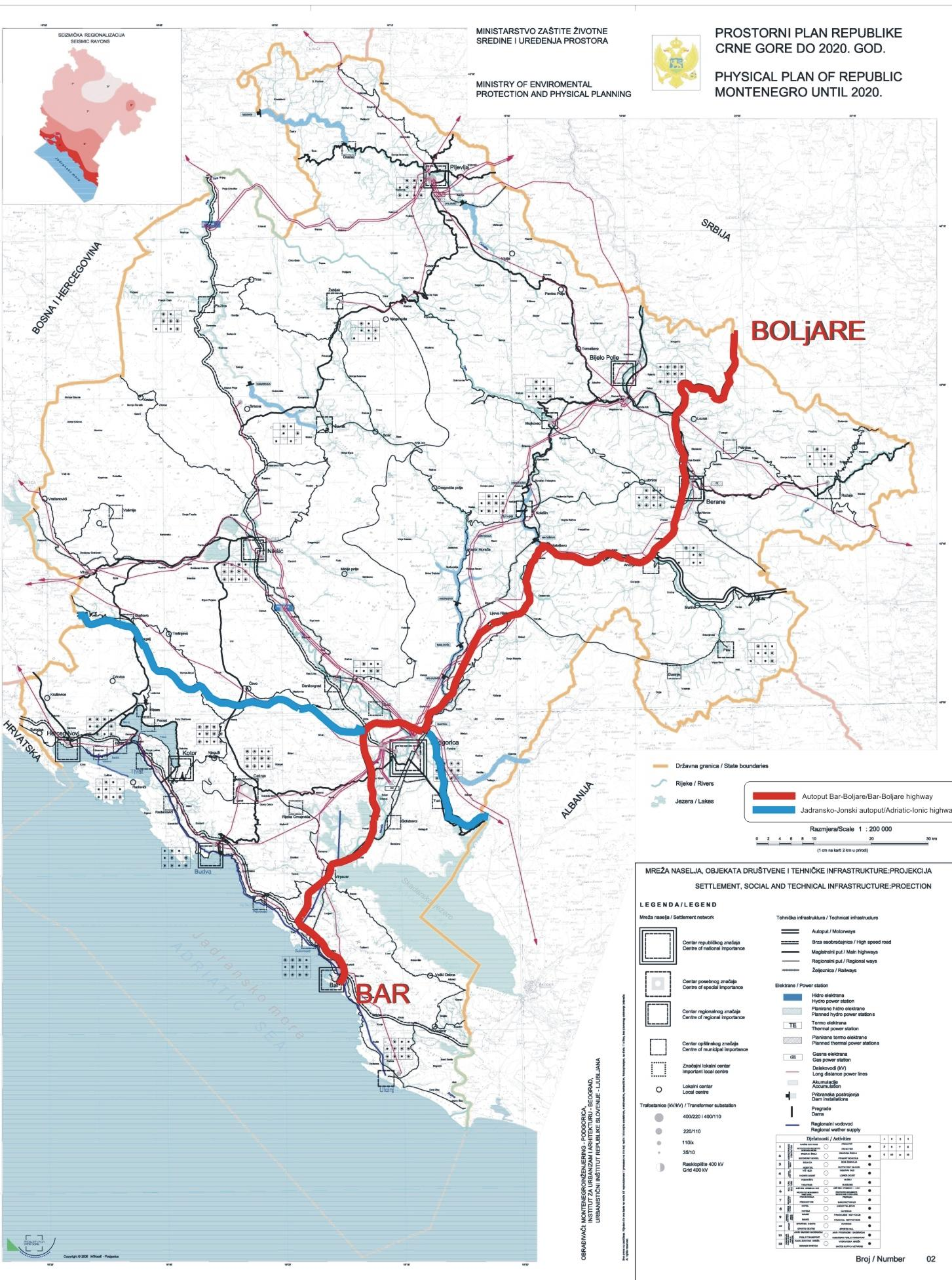
Corridors of future motorways in Montenegro. Adriatic - Ionian motorway is marked in blue

In the Spatial Plan of Montenegro, route of the Adriatic – Ionian motorway is currently defined as following:

- Nudo (border with Bosnia and Herzegovina) - Grahovo - Čevo - (Podgorica) Mareza - (Podgorica) Smokovac - Dinoša - Božaj (Border with Albania)

Thus, Government of Montenegro has considered only the option of motorway crossing southern Bosnia and Herzegovina near Trebinje. A parallel expressway along the coast is also planned, that will connect directly to Croatian road network at Debeli Brijeg, however, this is not considered a part of Adriatic – Ionian route, and will not be built to full motorway standard. This route is intended to relieve Adriatic Highway, and will follow the Montenegrin coastline closely, with Verige bridge included in its route.

Approximate length of motorway through Montenegro is 100 km, of which 10 km between Mareza and Smokovac is shared with Belgrade–Bar motorway.

Building of the Belgrade–Bar motorway is currently a priority for Montenegro, and concrete activities on building Adriatic – Ionian motorway are yet to begin.

Route
Road	Section	Length	Status
A2	border with Bosnia and Herzegovina / Nudo - Grahovo	16 km	tender in process
A2	Grahovo - Čevo	17 km	tender in process
A2	Čevo - Gradac	25 km	review in process
A1	Gradac - Virpazar	24 km	review in process, The shared part of the Bar – Boljare motorway and Adriatic – Ionian motorway route
A1	Virpazar - Stari Bar	26 km	design in process, Gradac interchange via Stari Bar motorway A1/A2
A2	Stari Bar - Ulcinj	16 km	design in process
A2	Ulcinj - Sukobin / border with Albania	10 km	design in process

=== Albania ===
Albania has mostly completed its north-south corridor (SH1 and SH4) connecting Montenegro with Greece. Remaining parts of the corridor are planned to be expanded to full motorway standard like building new sections between Muriqan/Sukobin border crossing to SH1 at Bushat south of Shkodër, Thumane-Kashar-Rrogozhinë highway part of Milot-Fier upgrade to motorway standard linking with Fier Bypass, and expanding SH4 south of Fier with slight deviation at Pocem near Memaliaj.

The motorway in Albania will pass on the current stretch along the western lowland, bypass Tirana through newly planned Thumane-Kashar-Rrogozhine motorway, continue south on the existing SH4, and enter inland at Fier towards Tepelene and Gjirokaster. Less than half of the above segments are single carriageways known as superstradë, while the segment SH4 Durrës-Fier has been widened to a dual carriageway.

routing
road	stretch	distance	status
SH1	Montenegro border / Muriqan - Bushat	ca. 20 km	new section planned between Muriqan/Sukobin border crossing and SH1 at Melgushe near Bushat, south of Shkodër
SH1	Melgushe - Balldren - Milot	ca. 45 km	completed as single carriageway, to be expanded to motorway standard, new Lezhë Bypass section in the form of tunnel at Balldren.
A1	Milot - Thumane	ca. 15 km	completed as a category-A motorway (autostradë)
A1	Thumane - Kashar	ca. 20 km	completed as a category-A motorway (autostradë)
SH2 - SH85 - SH4	Kashar - Rrogozhine	ca. 40 km	new section (planned as a category-A motorway) to link from the recent motorway interchange at Kashar with current SH4 at Lekaj
SH4	Rrogozhine - Fier(Levan)	ca. 60 km	completed as a dual carriageway (autostradë), Fier Bypass is completed (planned to be remade into a category-A highway)
SH4	Fier (Levan) - Fratar	ca. 35 km	completed as a single carriageway (superstradë) (planned to be remade into a double carriageway category-A motorway)
SH4	Fratar - Memaliaj	ca. 30 km	new section planned as a double carriageway category-A motorway to be constructed deviating from current SH4
SH4	Memaliaj - Tepelene - Gjirokaster	ca. 35 km	completed as a single carriageway (superstradë), Tepelene and Gjirokaster Bypasses to be completed (planned to be remade into a double carriageway category-A motorway)
SH4	Gjirokaster - Kakavija / Greece border	ca. 30 km	completed as a single carriageway (superstradë) (planned to be remade into a double carriageway category-A motorway)

=== Greece ===
In Greece, the Adriatic–Ionian motorway mainly follows the A5 motorway (Ionia Odos) from Ioannina to Pyrgos: it crosses the Gulf of Corinth via the Rio–Antirrio Bridge. Between the Albanian Border at Kakavia and Ioannina, the corridor follows the EO22, EO20 and EO5 national roads, although part of the current route (at least from Kalpaki to Ioannina) will be replaced by an expressway. Between Pyrgos and Kalamata, the corridor follows the EO9, EO9a and the A7: plans to replace part of that route with the A5, from Pyrgos to Tsakona, is delayed due to environmental concerns about the Kaiafas Lake.

routing
road	stretch	distance	status
EO22	Albania border / Kakavia - Ioannina (A2 junction)	ca. 50 km	National road, upgrade to motorway planned
A5	Ioannina (A2 junction) - Filippiada	ca. 50 km	Completed in August 2017
A5	Filippiada - Arta south (Arta bypass)	ca. 17 km	Completed in 2003
A5	Amfilochia - Arta	ca. 34 km	Completed in August 2017
A5	Kouvaras - Amfilochia	ca. 26 km	Completed in December 2016
A5	Kouvaras - Etoliko (Agrinio bypass)	ca. 34 km	Completed in May 2009
A5	Etoliko - Antirrio	ca. 45 km	Completed in June 2017
A5	Antirrio - Rio (Rio-Antirrio bridge)	ca. 5 km	Completed in 2004
A5	Rio - Mintilogli (Patras bypass)	ca. 20 km	Completed in 2002
A5	Mintilogli - Pyrgos	ca. 75 km	Completion due in 2025
EO9	Pyrgos - Kalo Nero	ca. 50 km	Delayed because of environmental concerns
EO9a	Kalo Nero - Tsakona	ca. 30 km	To be upgraded to motorway

== See also ==
- Adriatic Highway
- Transport in Slovenia
- Transport in Croatia
- Transport in Montenegro
- Transport in Bosnia and Herzegovina
- Transport in Albania
- Transport in Greece
