= A7 (Croatia) =

42.4-kilometre-long (26.3 mi) motorway in Croatia

A7 motorway
- Autocesta A7
- Primorka
- in use under construction planned other motorways

Route information
- Part of,
- Length: 42.4 km (26.3 mi) Length includes two access roads. Route partially completed. Total 103.5 km (64.3 mi) planned

Major junctions
- From: Slovenian route 6 at Rupa border crossing
- D8 in Rupa interchange A8 in Matulji interchange A6 in Orehovica interchange

- To: D8 D102 in Križišće interchange

Location
- Country: Croatia
- Counties: Primorje-Gorski Kotar
- Major cities: Kastav, Rijeka, Bakar, Kraljevica

Highway system
- Highways in Croatia

The A7 motorway (Croatian: Autocesta A7) is a 42.4-kilometre-long (26.3 mi) motorway in Croatia. It connects the nation's largest port in Rijeka, to the Croatian motorway network, as well as to the Rupa and Pasjak border crossings to Slovenia. The motorway forms part of a longitudinal transportation corridor in Croatia, and it is a part of European route E61 Villach–Ljubljana–Trieste–Rijeka. The A7 motorway route south of Orehovica interchange, where it also intersects Pan-European corridor Vb, is a part of European route E65.

The A7 motorway runs near a number of Croatian cities and provides access to Učka Nature Park and, indirectly, to numerous resorts in the Istria and Kvarner Gulf regions. The motorway is nationally significant because of its positive economic impact on the cities and towns it connects, and because of its contribution to tourism in Croatia. The importance of the motorway as a transit route will be further increased upon completion of a proposed expansion of the Port of Rijeka and Rijeka transport node.

The motorway consists of two traffic lanes and an emergency lane in each driving direction, separated by a central reservation. There are no emergency lanes in the tunnels. All intersections of the A7 motorway are grade separated. Numerous bridges, viaducts, tunnels, and other structures were required as the route traverses rugged terrain. As of 2010, there are ten exits and two rest areas situated along the route. Most of the motorway is not tolled, but a single section is tolled using an open toll system with pricing tied to vehicle classification.

== Route description ==
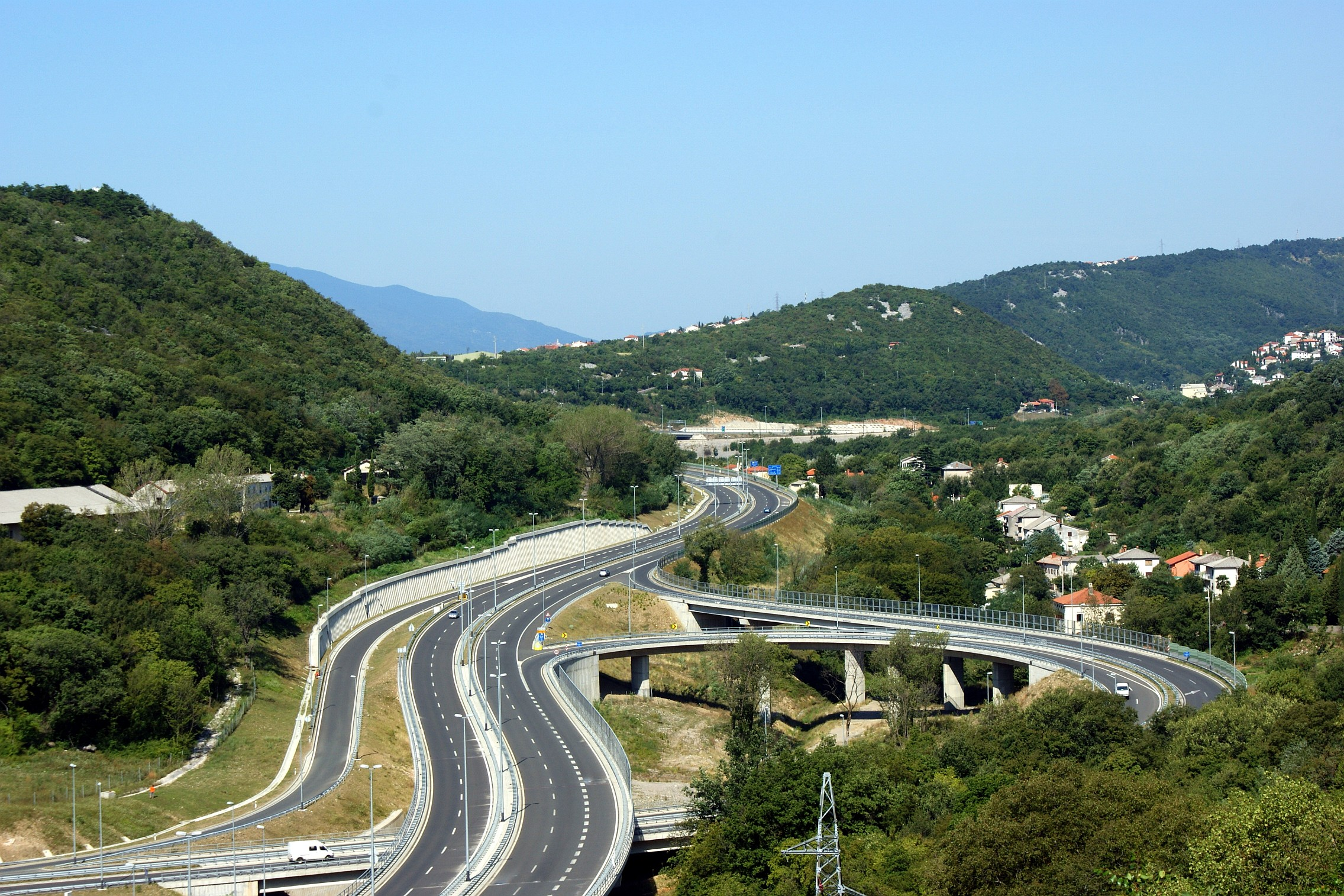
Draga interchange near Rijeka

The A7 motorway is an important north–south motorway in western Croatia, connecting the nation's largest port and the city of Rijeka to the Slovenian road network at the Rupa border crossing. The A7 motorway currently connects to the rest of the Croatian motorway network via the A6 motorway in Orehovica interchange. The motorway is a part of International E-road network routes E65 and E61. The sections south of Orehovica interchange are a part of the E65, while the remaining sections are a part of the E61.

The motorway is of major importance to Croatia in terms of its development of the economy of Croatia, most notably in tourism, as it represents the shortest and the most convenient route between Trieste, Italy or Ljubljana, Slovenia and the Adriatic Sea. This particularly applies to tourist resorts in the Kvarner Gulf area and to the Port of Rijeka, but it is also true for resorts in Istria, served via the A8 expressway. The genuine importance of the motorway as a transit route will be demonstrated upon completion of the A7 route to Žuta Lokva interchange of the A1 motorway and proposed expansion of the Port of Rijeka and Rijeka transport node. The former is planned as a part of completion of the Adriatic–Ionian motorway, while the latter is planned to encompass the growth of the Port of Rijeka's cargo handling capacity, improved railroad links and a new Rijeka bypass motorway linking the A7, via a number of new interchanges, to the A6 and A8 motorways. The project is, among other goals, aiming to increase traffic along the Croatian part of Pan-European corridor Vb, which connects to the A7 near Rijeka.

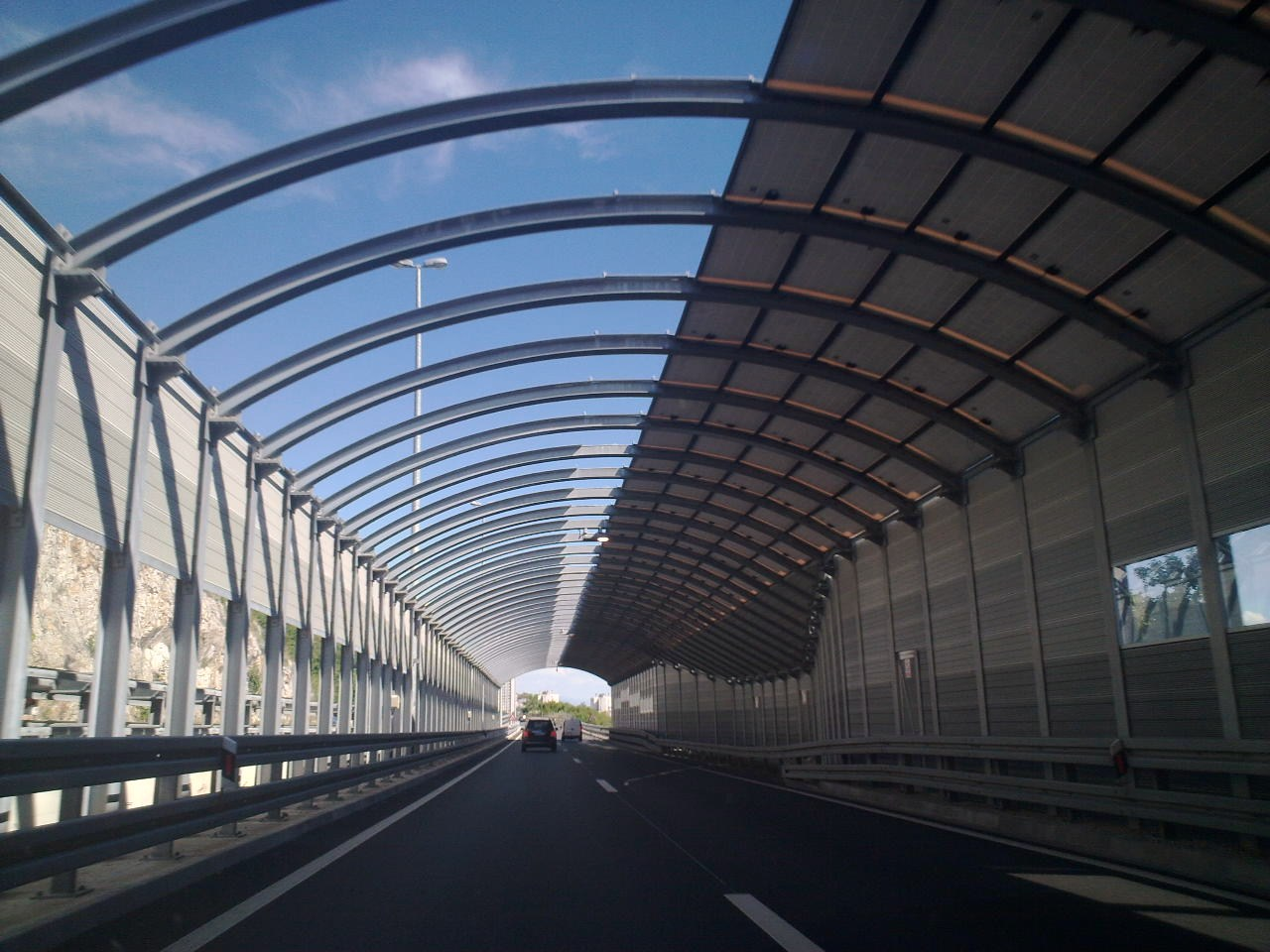
Noise protection barrier at the A7 near Rijeka

The motorway spans 42.4 kilometres (26.3 mi) between the Rupa border crossing to Slovenia and Križišće where southbound A7 traffic currently ends at a roundabout connecting to the state roads D8 and D102. It connects to Rijeka as it forms Rijeka bypass, the A8 expressway of the Istrian Y and the A6 which represents motorway connection to Zagreb and Split. Future development of the motorway will include southward extensions of the motorway towards Crikvenica, Novi Vinodolski, Senj, and ultimately Žuta Lokva interchange on the A1 motorway. The A7 motorway consists of two traffic lanes and an emergency lane in each driving direction along its entire length, except in tunnels where there are emergency bays rather than lanes. All existing interchanges are trumpet interchanges. There are two rest areas along the motorway, providing various types of services ranging from parking spaces and restrooms to filling stations and restaurants. The motorway has 13 interchanges, providing access to a number of towns and cities and to the Croatian state road network. The motorway is operated by Autocesta Rijeka – Zagreb.

An automatic traffic monitoring and guidance system is in place along the motorway. It consists of measuring, control, and signaling devices, located in zones where driving conditions may vary—at interchanges, near viaducts, beside bridges, in tunnels, and in zones where fog and strong winds are known to occur. The system consists of variable traffic signs used to communicate changing driving conditions, possible restrictions, and other information to motorway users.

The A7 motorway runs through hills, rugged coastal terrain, and urban areas, requiring a substantial number of bridges, viaducts, and tunnels along the route. Particular attention to the environment is also required since the route is situated in karst topography, which is particularly susceptible to water pollution, and the urbanized areas requiring special attention to be paid to noise pollution. Noise pollution was assessed as especially severe in the Rastočine neighborhood of Rijeka, where residential buildings are particularly close to the motorway route, most notably a 26-story high-rise only 40 metres (130 ft) away from the route. The noise pollution was addressed by building a noise barrier 352 metres (1,155 ft) long which largely encloses that motorway section like a tunnel. Curved overhead sections of the noise barrier are covered with 2,300 square metres (25,000 sq ft) of solar panels with annual electricity production capacity of 248,000 kWh.

== Toll ==
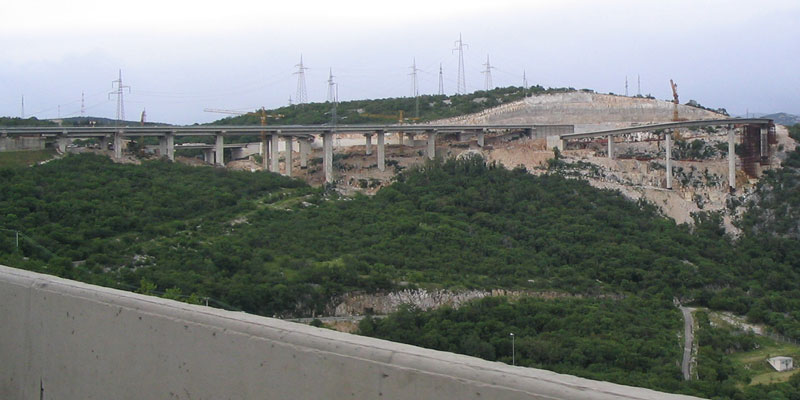
Sveti Kuzam interchange, the southern terminus of the A7

Only one section of the A7 motorway is tolled based on the vehicle classification in Croatia using an open toll system in place between the Rupa and Jurdani interchanges. The toll is payable in cash or by major credit and debit cards. A number of prepaid toll collection systems are also used, including various types of smart cards issued by the motorway operator and ENC—an electronic toll collection (ETC) system which is shared by most motorways in Croatia and provides drivers with discounted toll rates for dedicated lanes at toll plazas.

As of December 2010, Autocesta Rijeka–Zagreb collects toll on a single section of the motorway, between Rupa and Jurdani interchanges, close to the northern terminus of the motorway. Unlike those sections further south, which are used as bypass road of the city of Rijeka, therefore carrying substantial suburban and commuter traffic, the tolled section carries almost exclusively transit traffic. The Rupa toll plaza, located on the section reported 240,975 kuna (€ 32,400) collected during a single, peak season, weekend in July. Even though motorway traffic volume and thus toll revenue, decreased slightly elsewhere in the country, this particular tolled section reported virtually no change in income by 2010.

== Notable structures ==
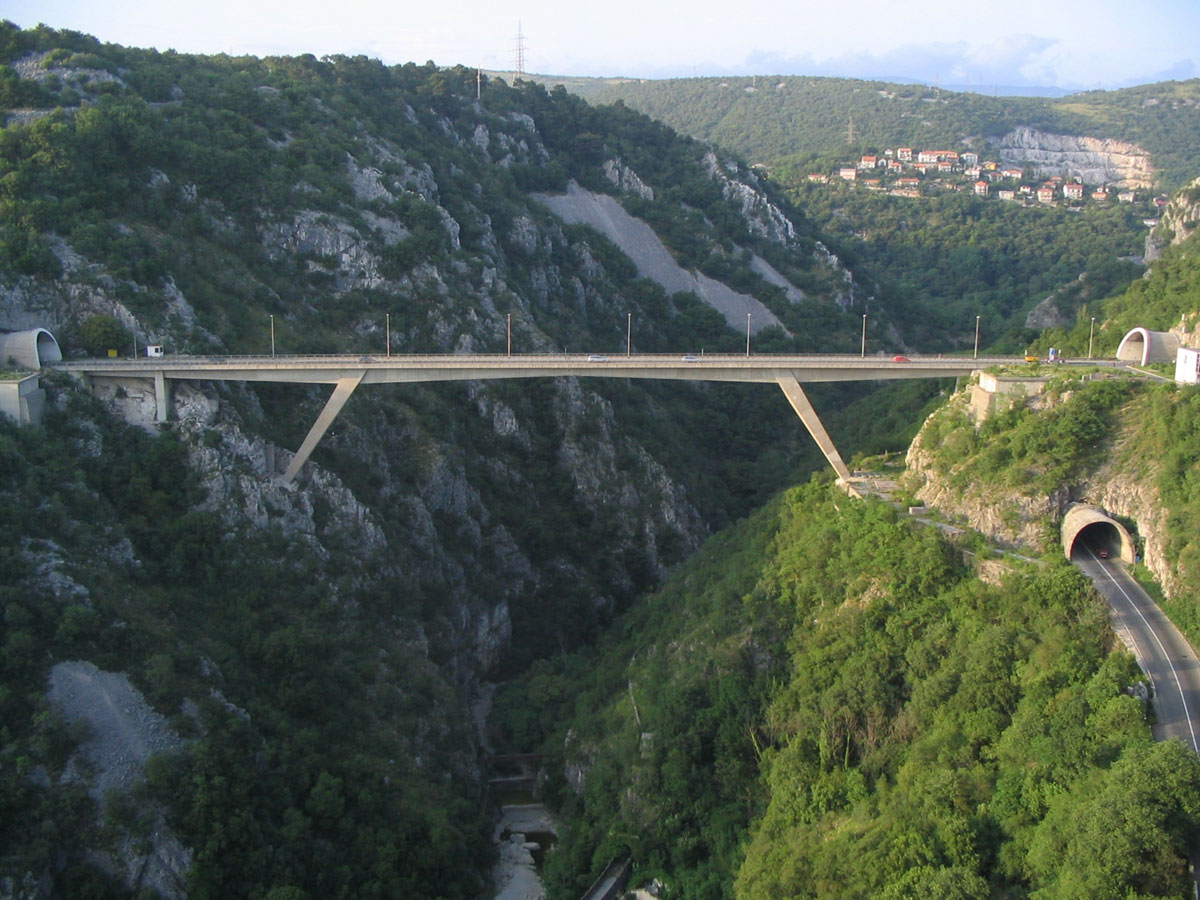
Rječina Bridge, prior to construction of the parallel structure in 2009

As the A7 motorway route runs through rugged terrain, it utilizes a substantial number of major structures—bridges, viaducts, tunnels, underpasses, flyovers, and culverts. A significant number of interchanges present along Rijeka bypass the 18-kilometre (11 mi) A7 section between Matulji and Sveti Kuzam which consists of seven interchanges (including the Orehovica interchange with the A6 motorway), thus yielding an average distance of only 3 kilometres (1.9 mi) between them.

The longest structures on the A7 motorway are the 858-metre (2,815 ft) Trsat Tunnel located on the Orehovica interchange–Škurinje section, the 595-metre (1,952 ft) Škurinje II Tunnel situated between Škurinje and Rujevica exits, and the 588-metre (1,929 ft) Vežica Viaduct built on Orehovica–Draga section of the motorway. Rječina Bridge, a 210-metre (690 ft) inclined strut reinforced concrete bridge spanning the Rječina River canyon, is also noteworthy because its design and construction conditions are different from normal since it spans a protected water supply zone. The bridge consists of two parallel structures, and the first one to be completed was the northern span in 1984. The southern span was the last structure completed on the present A7 motorway route, and it was opened to traffic in 2009, 25 years after the original span.

== History ==
=== Rijeka bypass ===
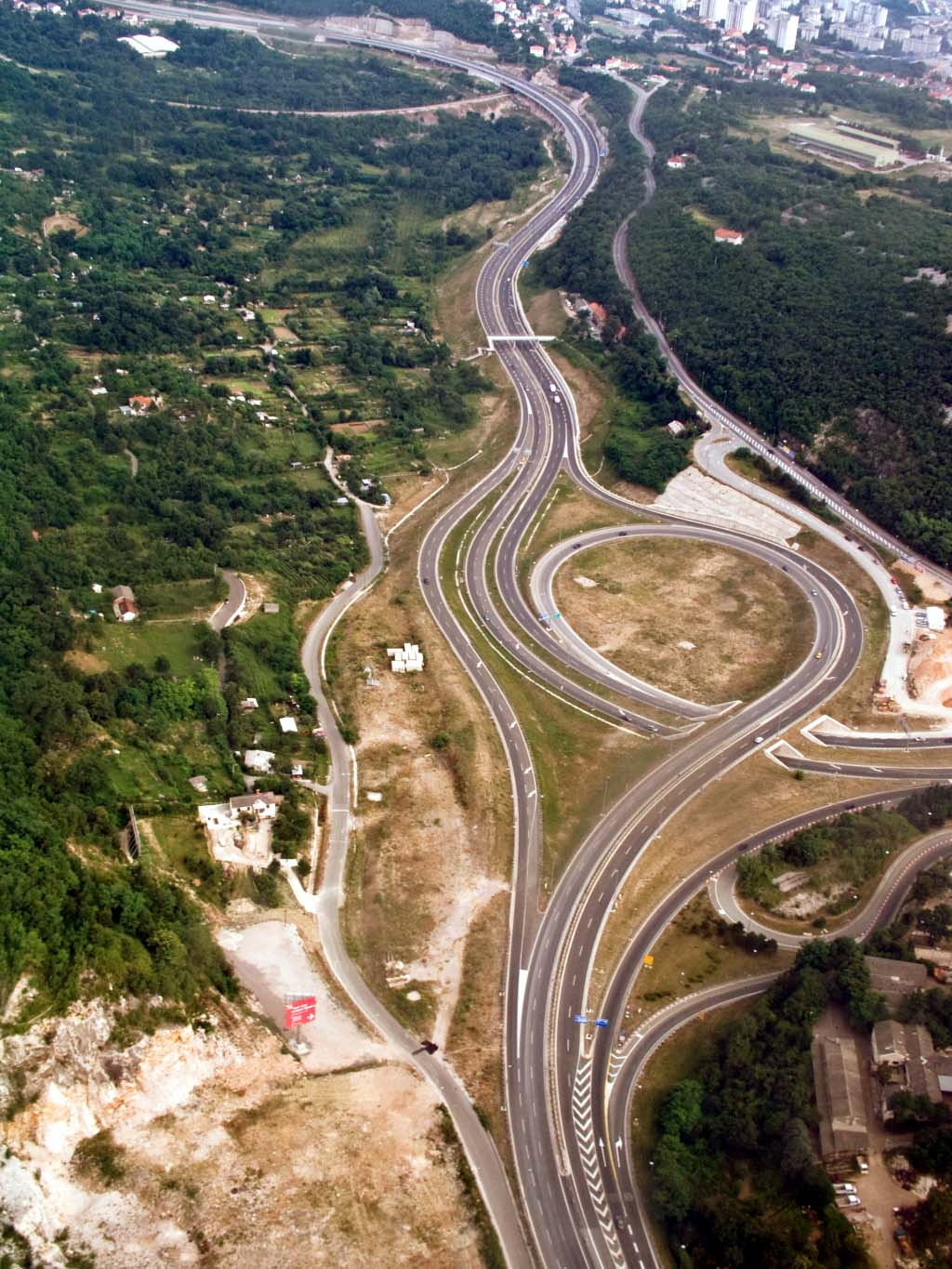
Orehovica interchange, the most significant interchange of the A7 motorway

Development of the city of Rijeka and the surrounding region (particularly in relation to the development of Port of Rijeka), associated transit transport of cargo, tourism and associated passenger traffic to the northern Adriatic resorts, rugged coastal topography, and the existing road routes running through the city of Rijeka itself, necessitated development of a high capacity bypass road to further the development and relieve congestion on the city streets. This was first officially formulated in spatial planning documents in 1974, and construction started in 1977. The first, 8.3-kilometre (5.2 mi) section was completed in July 1988, between Diračje and Orehovica interchange, executed as a two-lane expressway with grade separated intersections. The 4.0-kilometre (2.5 mi) Diračje–Matulji and Matulji–Jušići sections, completed in 1990 and 1991 respectively, were built as four-lane expressways without emergency lanes. Those completed the western arm of Rijeka bypass, but traffic proceeding east from Orehovica interchange to Krk Island, Crikvenica, and Senj still had to switch to the streets of Rijeka.

=== Modern motorway ===
In the 2000s, as the first stage of the A6 motorway construction spanning between Zagreb and Rijeka neared completion, construction of a proper motorway along the A7 route started. In 2004, when the first stage of Rijeka–Zagreb motorway was completed, the A7 route was extended by 3.7 kilometres (2.3 mi) to Jurdani, and in 2005, another 11-kilometre (6.8 mi) section was completed between Jurdani and the Slovenian border. The two new sections were the first ones built as a six-lane motorway. In May 2006, the motorway extended 6.35 kilometres (3.95 mi) east to Sveti Kuzam, forming the eastern arm of Rijeka bypass, relieving that part of the city from the transit traffic. Finally, after the Rijeka–Zagreb motorway was completed in 2008, work on the remaining single-carriageway section of the route intensified. In December 2009, the Diračje–Orehovica section was upgraded to four-lane motorway, thus bringing the entire route between Rupa border crossing and Sveti Kuzam interchange to a uniform standard.

Even though Hrvatske autoceste normally develops motorways in Croatia, as of September 2007, Autocesta Rijeka – Zagreb was granted expansion of the concession previously awarded. The new concession contract included development and maintenance of the A7 motorway north of Križišće interchange, Krk Bridge, and a number of motorway access roads. At the same time, the concession period was extended to 32 years and 11 months, starting on the date of the original concession contract. Therefore, the concession, in its present form, will expire on May 28, 2031. Construction costs incurred after 2007, when Autocesta Rijeka – Zagreb took over the motorway development, were estimated at 105 million euros.

== Future ==
=== Completion of Križišće - Žuta Lokva section ===
Long-term plans of development of the A7 motorway, published in the 2000s, involved an extension of the southern terminus at Križišće to the interchange with the A1 motorway at Žuta Lokva, a distance of approximately 56 km. This will also go toward completion of Croatia's section of the Adriatic–Ionian motorway. The section was initially planned to be opened as an expressway by 2009, but those plans were delayed indefinitely. In 2012, the Croatian government announced that no funds would be made available in near future for construction of A7 south of Križišće.

In June 2023, it was announced by Croatia's Minister of Maritime Affairs, Transport and Infrastructure Oleg Butković and HAC that the road was planned for completion by 2030 or before. In 2025, tender procedures were started for construction of the 17.5-kilometre (10.9 mi) section of the A7 between Križišće and Selce.

The bypass of Novi Vinodolski, is under construction since 2022. The two-lane 9.8-kilometre (6.1 mi) route is partially concurrent with the A7 route. Ultimately, 6.5 kilometres (4.0 mi) of the bypass will become one carriageway of the A7, spanning Selce and Novi Vinodolski junctions while the remainder will serve as connecting roads to the junctions. The bypass construction works are planned to be completed in the second half of 2026. The route of the bypass runs through demanding terrain requiring construction of the 843-metre (2,766 ft) long Zagori tunnel (excavated in 2024) and the Ričina viaduct across the Vinodol valley, 1,057-metre (3,468 ft) long.

=== New Rijeka bypass ===
Further long-term plans specify a wider and longer outer Rijeka bypass which is planned on the Jurdani-Marčelji-Kikovica-Kraljevica route. Similarly, a new interchange of the A8 and A7 motorways is planned near Jušići. However, these long-term plans, even though they are well documented in government studies, still have no funding approved.

== Traffic volume ==
Traffic is regularly counted by means of a traffic census at Rupa mainline toll plaza as well as at two other sections of the motorway which are not tolled. The traffic volume is reported by Autocesta Rijeka – Zagreb, the operator of the motorway, and are published by Hrvatske ceste. The traffic is heaviest along the western arm of Rijeka bypass as the section serves the city and acts as a link between the A8 and the A6 motorways while carrying regular A7 traffic. That part of the A7 motorway carries a 20,100-vehicle annual average daily traffic (AADT), and a 31,700-vehicle average summer daily traffic (ASDT) figure. Substantial differences observed between AADT and ASDT numbers are usually attributed to the fact that the motorway carries significant tourist traffic to Istria and Kvarner Gulf area. The seasonal increase in traffic volume ranges from 10% on the south of Oštrovica interchange to 120% as measured on the Rupa–Matulji section. The central part of the motorway exhibits summer-season traffic volume increase of approximately 50%.

A7 traffic volume details
Counting site	AADT	ASDT	Notes
2818 Rupa toll plaza	6,653	14,634	Between Rupa and Jurdani interchanges.
2807 Rijeka bypass	20,100	31,700	Between A8 and D304 junctions.
2810 Katarina Tunnel	15,700	17,211	Between A6 and D403 junctions. AADT figure estimated by Hrvatske Ceste.

== Rest areas ==
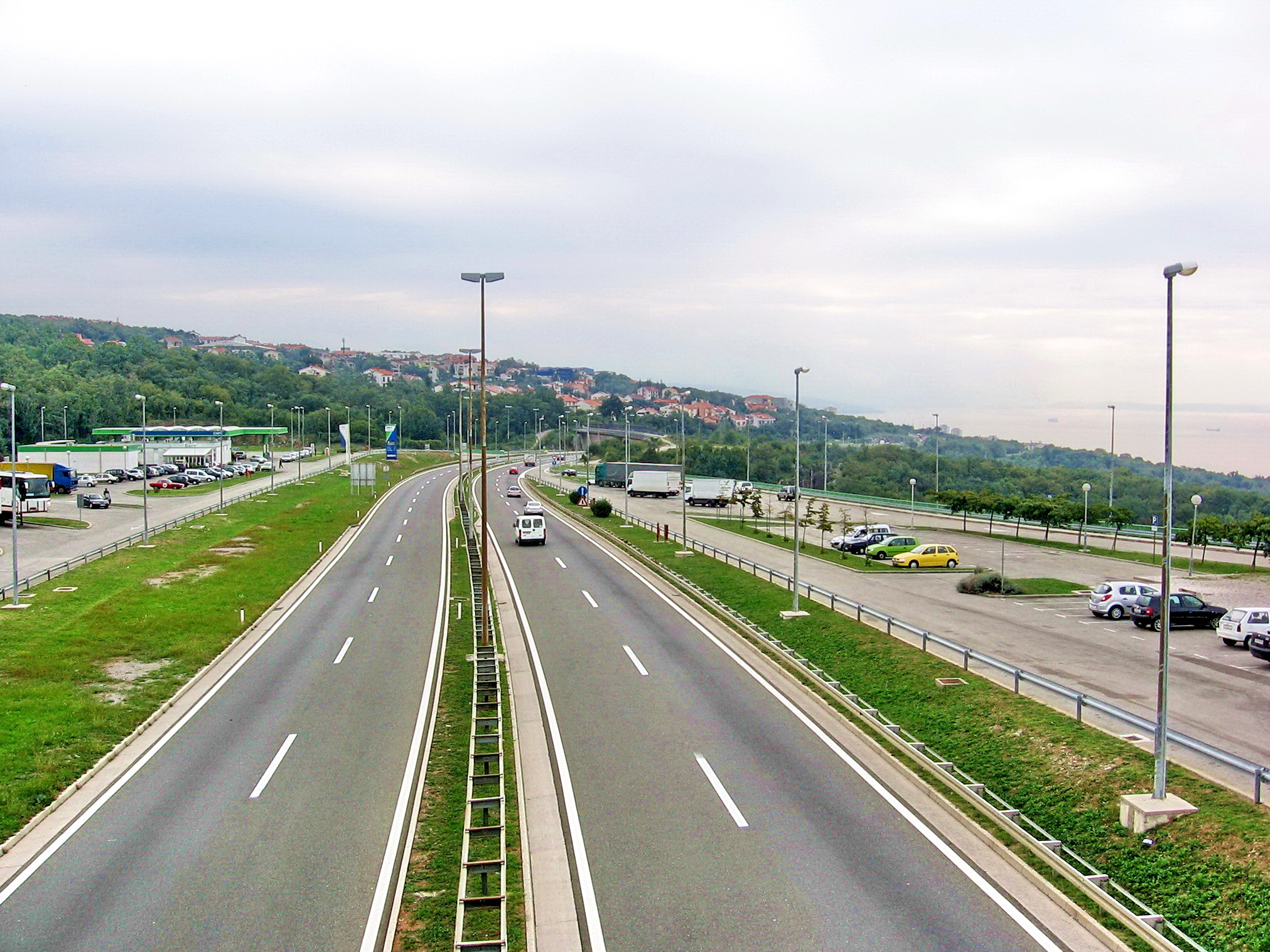
The A7 at Vrata Jadrana rest area

As of November 2010, there are only two rest areas operating along the A7 motorway. Applicable legislation provides for four types of rest areas designated as types A through D: A-type rest areas comprise a full range of amenities including a filling station, a restaurant, and a hotel or motel; B-type rest areas have no lodging; C-type rest areas are very common and include a filling station and a café but no restaurants or accommodations; and D-type rest areas offer parking spaces only, with possibly some picnic tables, benches, and restrooms. Even though the rest areas found along the A7 motorway follow this ranking system, the Vrata Jadrana rest area is a C-type rest area and the Rupa rest area is a B-type facility. The filling stations also offer LPG fuel and include small convenience stores.

The primary motorway operator, Autocesta Rijeka–Zagreb, leases the rest areas to various operators through public tenders. As of November 2010, both rest areas found along the A7 motorway are operated by OMV. The rest area operators are not permitted to sub-lease the fuel operations, but they are also penalized if some facilities required by the lease contract are not operating. All of the A7 motorway rest areas, are accessible from both traffic directions of the motorway. The rest areas normally operate 24 hours a day, seven days a week.

List of A7 motorway rest areas
County	km	Name	Operators	Notes
Primorje-Gorski Kotar	5.5	Brgud	OMV	Facilities found at Brgud (previously Rupa) rest area are a filling station selling petrol, diesel fuel, and LPG, a café, a restaurant, and restrooms.
Primorje-Gorski Kotar	18.0	Vrata Jadrana	OMV; McDonald's	Facilities found at Vrata Jadrana rest area are a filling station selling petrol, diesel fuel, and LPG, a café, and restrooms.
1.000 mi = 1.609 km; 1.000 km = 0.621 mi

== Exit list ==
County	km	Exit	Name	Destination	Notes
Primorje-Gorski Kotar	0.0	Border crossing within the EU	Rupa border crossing	6 E61	Rupa border crossing to Slovenia. The road continues into Slovenia as route 6 towards Ilirska Bistrica and Ljubljana; The northern terminus of the European route E61 concurrency and the northern terminus of the motorway
Primorje-Gorski Kotar	1.9	1	Rupa	D8	Connection to D8 and Pasjak border crossing; That route extends into Slovenia as route 7 and further on to Trieste, Italy
Primorje-Gorski Kotar	4.0	Toll traffic plaza sign	Rupa toll plaza		
Primorje-Gorski Kotar	5.5	Rest area traffic sign	Brgud rest area		
Primorje-Gorski Kotar	11.4	3	Jurdani	D8	Connection to Jurdani and Jušići
Primorje-Gorski Kotar	15.0	4	Trinajstići	D8	Connection to Trinajstići; Opened in October 2023
Primorje-Gorski Kotar	16.4	5	Učka	A8 E751	Also a connection a number of cities and towns via the A8 motorway (E751) including Rijeka via Kvarnerska Cesta, Opatija and Matulji
Primorje-Gorski Kotar	18.0	Rest area traffic sign	Vrata Jadrana rest area		
Primorje-Gorski Kotar	20.0	6	Diračje	D304	Connection to Rijeka and Kastav and Diračje
Primorje-Gorski Kotar	23.1	7	Rujevica	Ž5025	
Primorje-Gorski Kotar	23.9	8	Škurinje	D403	Connection to Rijeka and the Port of Rijeka (west)
Primorje-Gorski Kotar		9	Kozala		Planned connection to Kozala
Primorje-Gorski Kotar	27.3	Rječina Bridge			
Primorje-Gorski Kotar	28.5	10	Orehovica	A6 E61 E65	Connection to the A6 motorway (E65); The southern terminus of the European route E61 concurrency; The northern terminus of the European route E65 concurrency
Primorje-Gorski Kotar	31.0	11	Draga	D404	Connection to Vežica, Brajdica and the Port of Rijeka (Brajdica)
Primorje-Gorski Kotar	34.4	12	Sveti Kuzam	D40	Connection to Bakar, and Čavle
Primorje-Gorski Kotar	39.7	13	Hreljin	D501	Access to Hreljin, Meja and Križišće
Primorje-Gorski Kotar	42.4	14	Križišće	D8 D102 E65	Access to Šmrika and Omišalj; The southern terminus of the European route E65 concurrency; The southern terminus of the motorway
Lika-Senj County	103.5		Žuta Lokva	A1	Interchange with A1 (Connection with Zagreb, Split); Planned as a part of Adriatic–Ionian motorway
1.000 mi = 1.609 km; 1.000 km = 0.621 mi: Concurrency terminus; Unopened

== See also ==
- International E-road network
- Transport in Croatia
