= D403 road =

Road in Croatia

D403 state road

Route information
- Length: 2.5 km (1.6 mi)

Major junctions
- From: A7 in Škurinje interchange
- D8 in Rijeka
- To: Port of Rijeka - West terminal

Location
- Country: Croatia
- Counties: Primorje-Gorski Kotar
- Major cities: Rijeka

Highway system
- Highways in Croatia

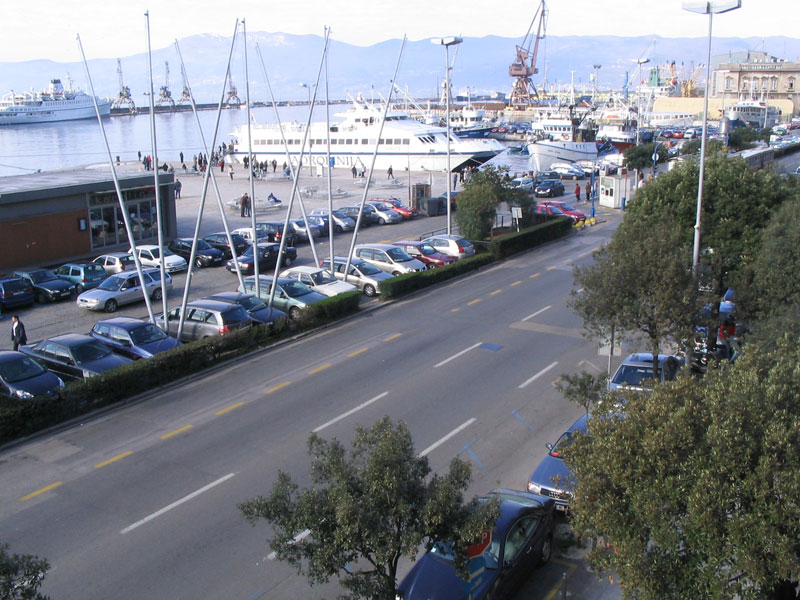
Port of Rijeka, at the southern terminus of D403.

D403 is a state road connecting A7 motorway Škurinje interchange to the centre of the city of Rijeka, and to the Port of Rijeka West terminal. The road is 2.5 km (1.6 mi) long.

The D403 state road is scheduled for a reconstruction in order to provide a more efficient connection to the Port of Rijeka, but those plans have been postponed. Currently, D-403 comprises many urban at-grade intersections within the city of Rijeka.

The road, as well as all other state roads in Croatia, is managed and maintained by Hrvatske ceste, state owned company.

== Road junctions and populated areas ==
D403 junctions/populated areas
Type	Slip roads/Notes
	A7 - Škurinje interchange - connection to Rupa and Pasjak border crossings to Slovenia via A7 motorway and to Pula via A8 motorway to the west and to A6 motorway to the east. The northern terminus of the road.
	Rijeka; D8 to Matulji to the west and Bakar to the east.
	Port of Rijeka - West terminal. The southern terminus of the road.

== See also ==
- Autocesta Rijeka - Zagreb
