= D40 road (Croatia) =

Road in Croatia

D40 state road

Route information
- Length: 3.1 km (1.9 mi)

Major junctions
- From: A7 in Sveti Kuzam interchange
- D8 near Bakar
- To: Port of Bakar

Location
- Country: Croatia
- Counties: Primorje-Gorski Kotar
- Major cities: Bakar

Highway system
- Highways in Croatia

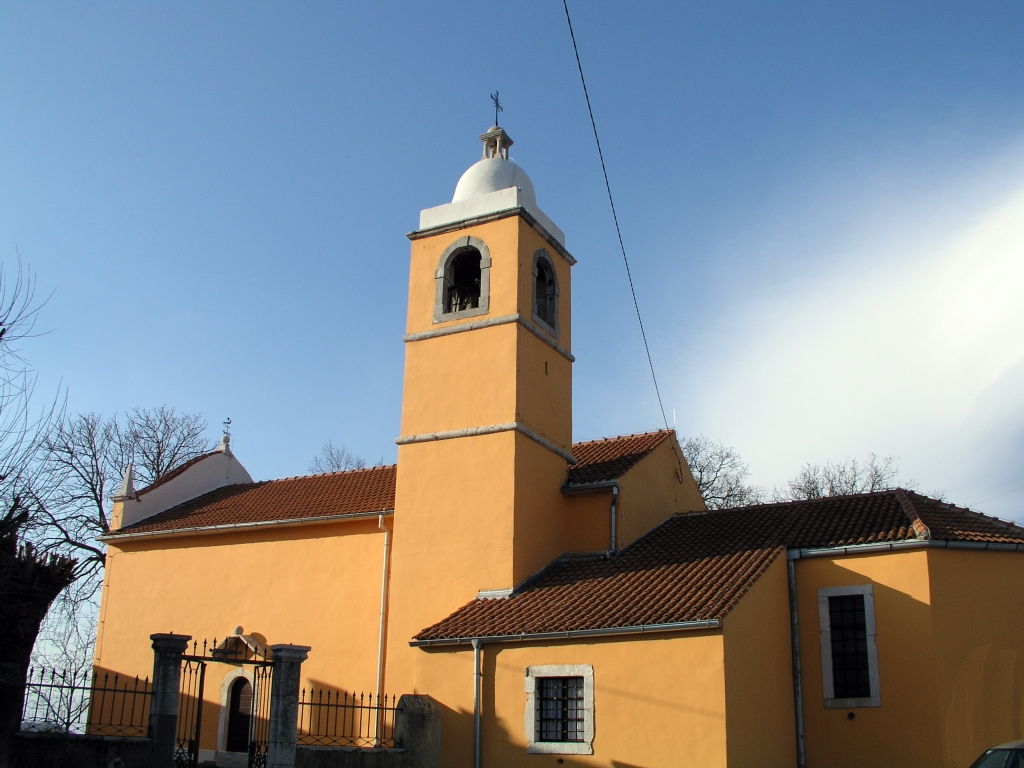
Sveti Kuzam, adjacent to the D40 road

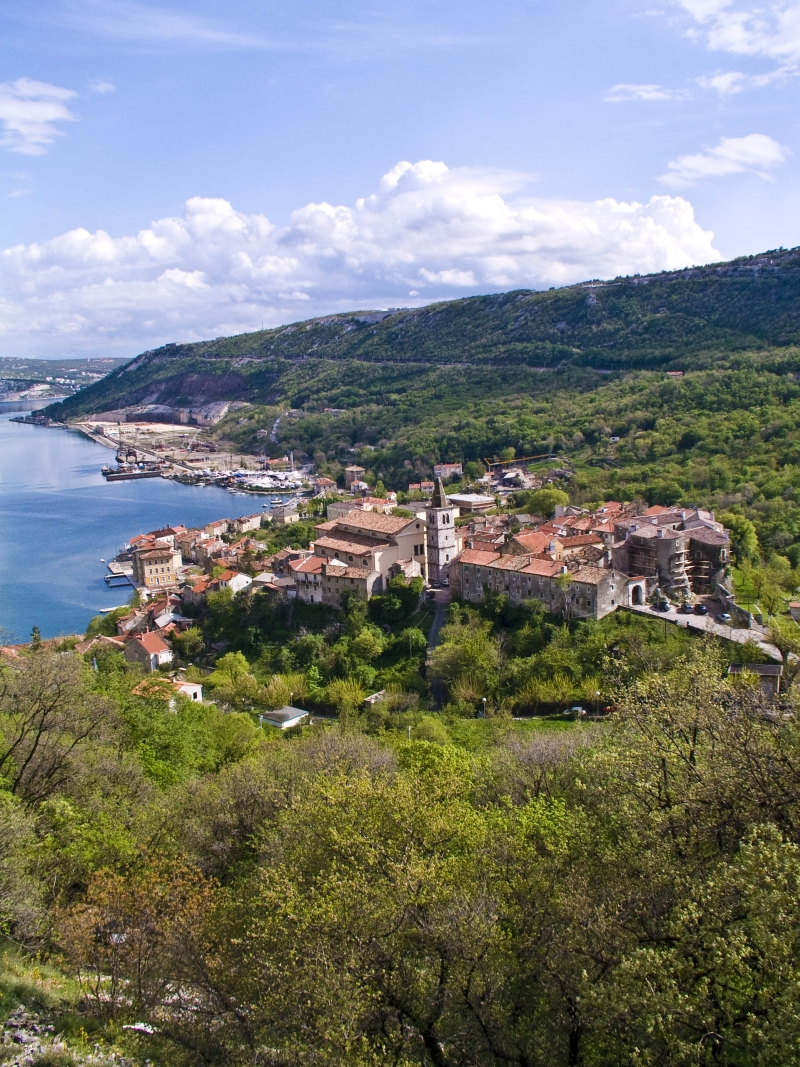
Bakar, immediately to the south of the southern D40 terminus

D40 is a state road connecting A7 motorway at Sveti Kuzam interchange, to D8 state road and to Port of Bakar. The road is 3.1 km (1.9 mi) long.

The road, as well as all other state roads in Croatia, is managed and maintained by Hrvatske ceste, a state owned company.

== Road junctions and populated areas ==
D40 junctions/populated areas
Type	Slip roads/Notes
	A7 Sveti Kuzam interchange. To Orehovica interchange (to the west) and to Križišće (to the east). Ž5205 to Škrljevo and Čavle (D3). Northern terminus of the road.
	D8 to Rijeka (to the west) and Kraljevica and Crikvenica (to the east).
	Port of Bakar (West); Southern terminus of the road.
