= Jušići =

Jušići may refer to:

- Jušići, Bosnia and Herzegovina, a village near Trebinje
- Jušići, Croatia, a village near Matulji
