= Lipa Remembers Memorial Centre =

Museum

"Lipa Remembers" Memorial Centre
- Memorijalni centar Lipa pamti
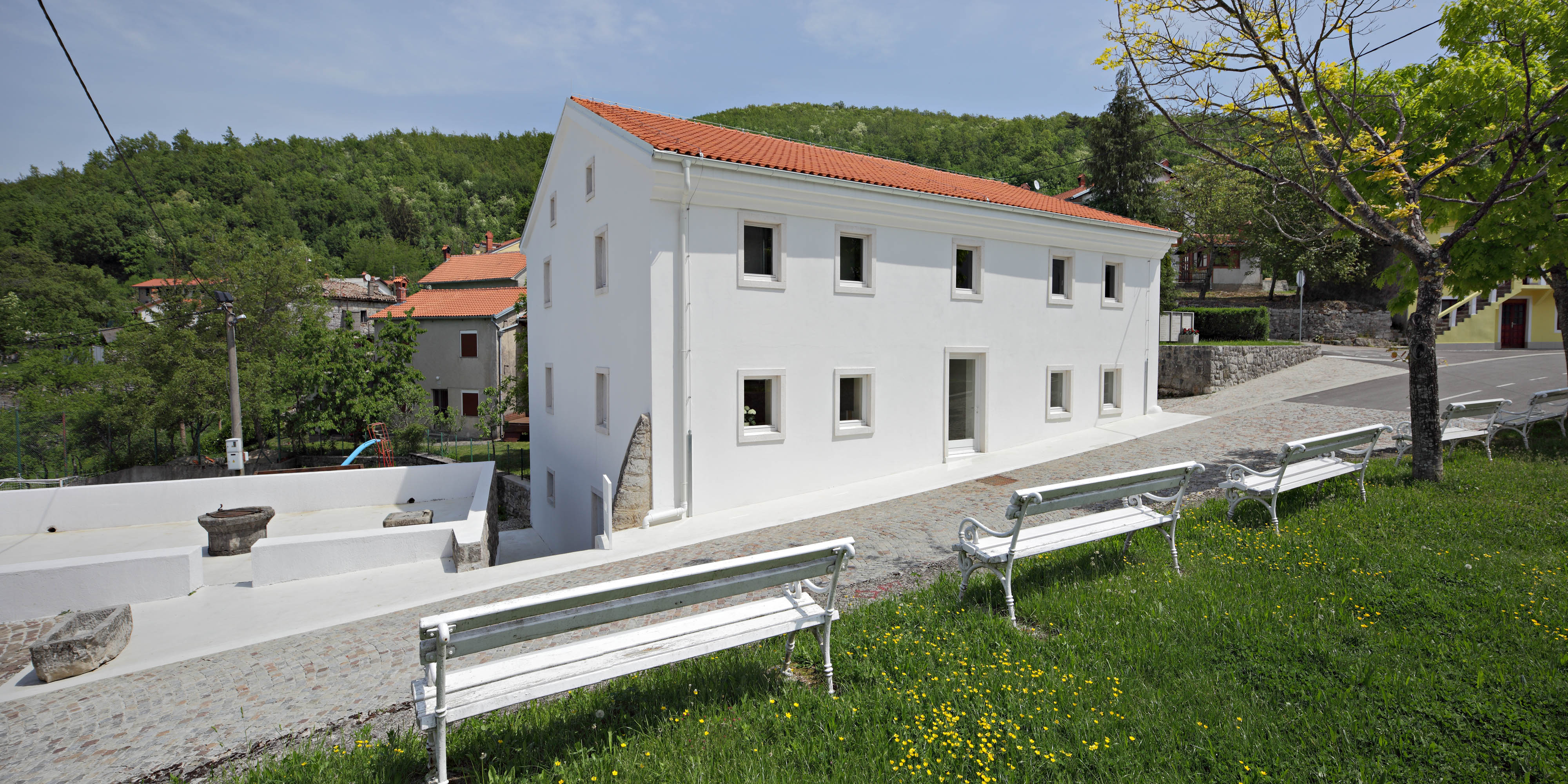
- Exterior of the museum
- Established: April 2015
- Location: Lipa, Matulji, Croatia
- Coordinates: 45°27′59″N 14°18′15″E
- Type: memorial
- Director: Danica Maljavac
- Parking: On site (no charge)
- Website: lipapamti.ppmhp.hr

The "Lipa Remembers" Memorial Centre (Memorijalni centar "Lipa pamti") is a museum commemorating the killing of 269 civilians - mostly elderly, women and children - in April 1944 in Lipa, a village near Rijeka, Croatia. The massacre was perpetrated by the German military, together with Italian and Chetnik collaborationist forces.

== Background ==
After Italy's capitulation in 1943, the entire Liburnian Karst region was occupied by Germans, as part of the Operational Zone of the Adriatic Littoral (OZAK). Italian forces of the fascist Italian Social Republic continued to operate under German command. Local Partisans were undertaking taking numerous guerrilla actions, supported by the local population which provided them hideouts, food and supplies. In November 1943 OZAK was declared a combat zone against partisan "gangs" (Bandenkampfgebiet) and in January 1944 the special Command of the SS and police was formed in Trieste (Fuhrungsstab für Bandenbekämpfen - FSBB) for planning and conducting that fight against partisans and their supporters under the command of Odilo Globočnik, the Higher SS and Police Leader of OZAK. The so-called Ten Commandments, were issued on 24 February 1944 by the general of the German 97th army corps, Ludwig Kübler, ordering the occupation forces to use looting, arson of civilian property and killing of civilians as effective means to fight Partisan "gangs".

=== Braunschweig offensive ===
Due to German inability to establish control over railroad and road traffic in the important Rijeka-Trieste corridor, Ludwig Kübler decided to try to keep Istrian partisans away by launching a new offensive on the mountain massif Učka-Planik-Lisina. The offensive, known as the Braunschweig offensive was launched on 25 April 1944 with the participation of motorized Wehrmacht forces and special SS police formations. Anticipating the Nazis' intentions, partisans managed to withdraw their main units from the Učka and Ćićarija sectors and transfer them north of the railway and the main road to the Klana-Kastav-Ilirska Bistrica area. Having moved most of their forces north, partisans continued with their operations and on 30 April 1944 launched a decisive attack with mortar fire on a garrison of fascist military police (Milizia per la Difesa Territoriale) situated in Rupa from a position near Lipa. The attack started at 5 a.m. and lasted two hours. The garrison's commander was Aurelio Piesz from Rijeka (Fiume). Unexpectedly, a smaller motorized German convoy appeared at Rupa and was subject to intense fire. Four German soldiers were killed and more still badly wounded; thereupon the partisan group withdrew to nearby Lisac village. An immediate rallying of Nazi and Fascist forces from the neighbouring and other garrisons followed.

== The Massacre ==
German, Italian and Chetnik forces entered the village of Lipa on April 30, 1944, around 2.30 p.m. and started a massacre by torturing and killing 21 inhabitants and burning all 87 houses and 85 commercial buildings in the village, ransacking belongings and plundering cattle. The remaining inhabitants were ordered to pack their essentials and set out towards Rupa. At the last house in Lipa, they were told to leave their belongings and were forced into a building (so called Kvartirka's house), then the building was doused with petrol and set on fire. Many people were burned alive. 269 inhabitants, all civilians, were killed. The victims were primarily the elderly, women and between 96 and 121 children, the youngest victim being Bosiljka Iskra, only 7 months old. The only survivors of the massacre were those who by chance were either not in Lipa that tragic Sunday, plus six people in the village who somehow managed to hide.

Without trustworthy documentation, it is not possible to ascertain why the Nazis vented their anger on and took a genocidal reprisal against the inhabitants of Lipa. They certainly wanted to frighten the inhabitants of Liburnian karst and divide them from the National Liberation Movement, which they supported. Regardless of the motive and reasons this was one of the most appalling war crimes committed in the territory of Istria in World War II.

== Aftermath ==
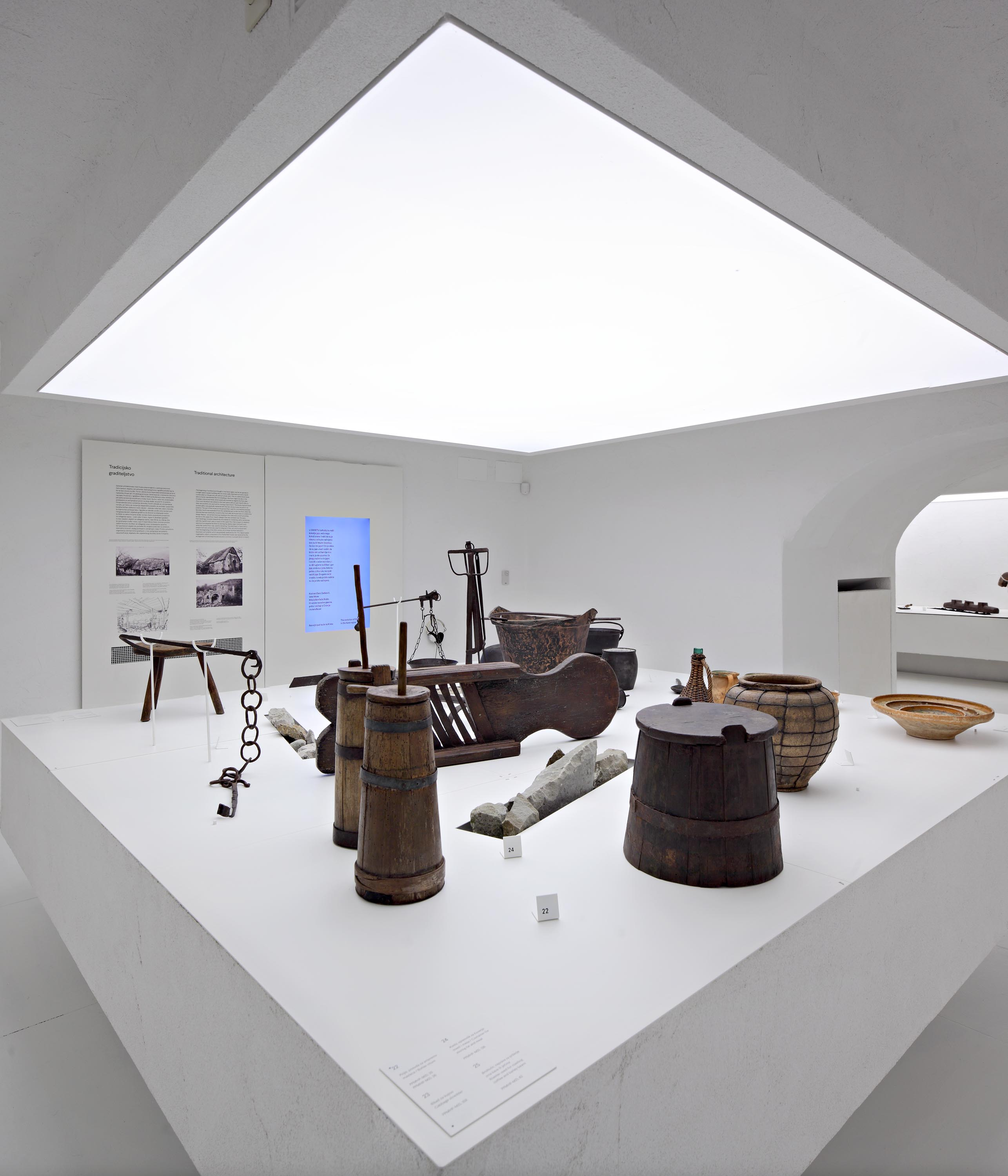
Ethnographic exhibition of the Memorial Centre Lipa Remembers

Around hundred Lipa inhabitants survived, mostly those who were lucky enough to be absent from the village at the time of the massacre: men in the partisans, women taking food to the partisan hideouts, children taking cattle to pastures, a few men preparing traditional bonfire on the surrounding hills etc. The survivors greeted the end of World War II homeless and desperate. A long and strenuous reconstruction began with lives affected by a sense of loss. As in Oradour-sur-Glane, the destroyed houses were not rebuilt, instead new housing was built for the surviving inhabitants.

According to the 1945 court testimony of a captured member of the participating fascist unit, Umberto Scalla, the massacre in Lipa was carried out by 150 soldiers - 80 Germans, 40 Italian fascists, and 30 Chetniks. After the war, 36 of them were identified, but only one, the Italian commander Aurelio Piesz, was tried for the crime, found guilty and hanged in Trieste in 1945.

== The Memorial Centre ==
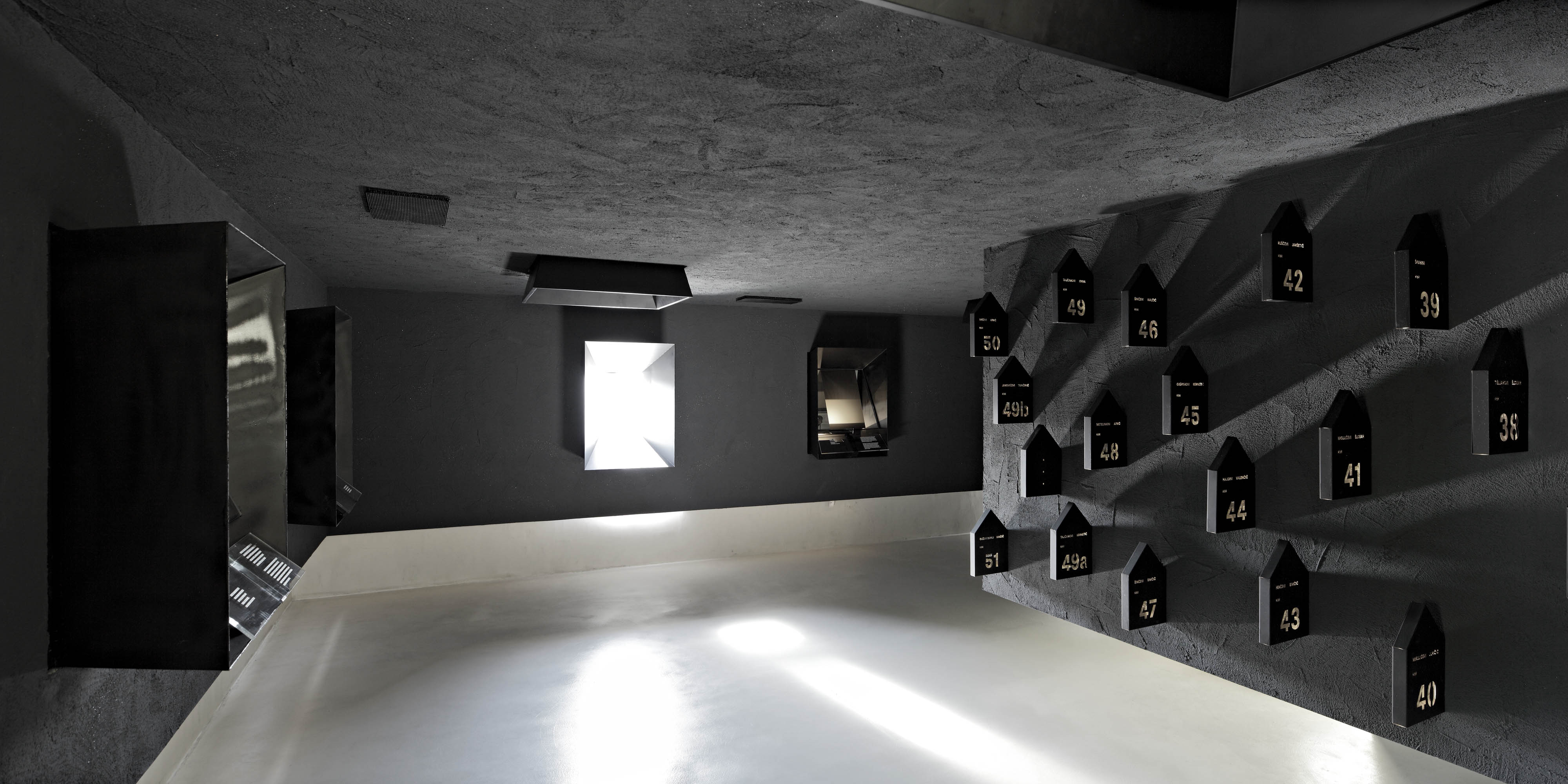
Memorial exhibition of the Memorial Centre Lipa Remembers

The Memorial Centre, Lipa Remembers, opened in April 2015 in the small locality of Lipa situated on the border between Croatia and Slovenia. The Centre functions as a part of a larger Maritime and History Museum of the Croatian Littoral situated in Rijeka and it is cofounded by the Primorje-Gorski Kotar County and the Matulji Municipality. The Centre was restored on the site of the older Memorial museum of Lipa that functioned from 1968 till 1989 when it was closed due to lack of funds.

The Memorial Centre’s permanent exhibition interprets the history of World War II in the region of Liburnian Karst which, besides Lipa, incorporates the villages of Pasjak, Rupa, Šapjane and Brdce. The memorial exhibition is complemented by the cultural and ethnographic heritage of the region showing the continuity of life, starting from prehistoric times until today. Using a holistic approach, the tragic event of April 30, 1944 can be seen in a broader context, as one of the many identity features belonging to the vital and potent community of Lipa.

The Centres activities are based on the principles of community museums and homeland museums. In unity with the local population Centre actively contributes to the research and creation of this region’s identity, and also helps discovering new and sustainable possibilities for development and growth. All programme activities are concentrated on promoting tolerance, nonviolence and life in a multitude of its manifestations and features.

== See also ==
- Gudovac massacre
- Ivanci massacre
- Lidice massacre
- Oradour-sur-Glane massacre
