= European route E61 =

Road in trans-European E-road network

E61

Route information
- Length: 270 km (170 mi)

Major junctions
- North end: Villach, Austria
- South end: Rijeka, Croatia

Location
- Countries: Austria; Slovenia; Italy; Croatia

Highway system
- International E-road network; A Class; B Class

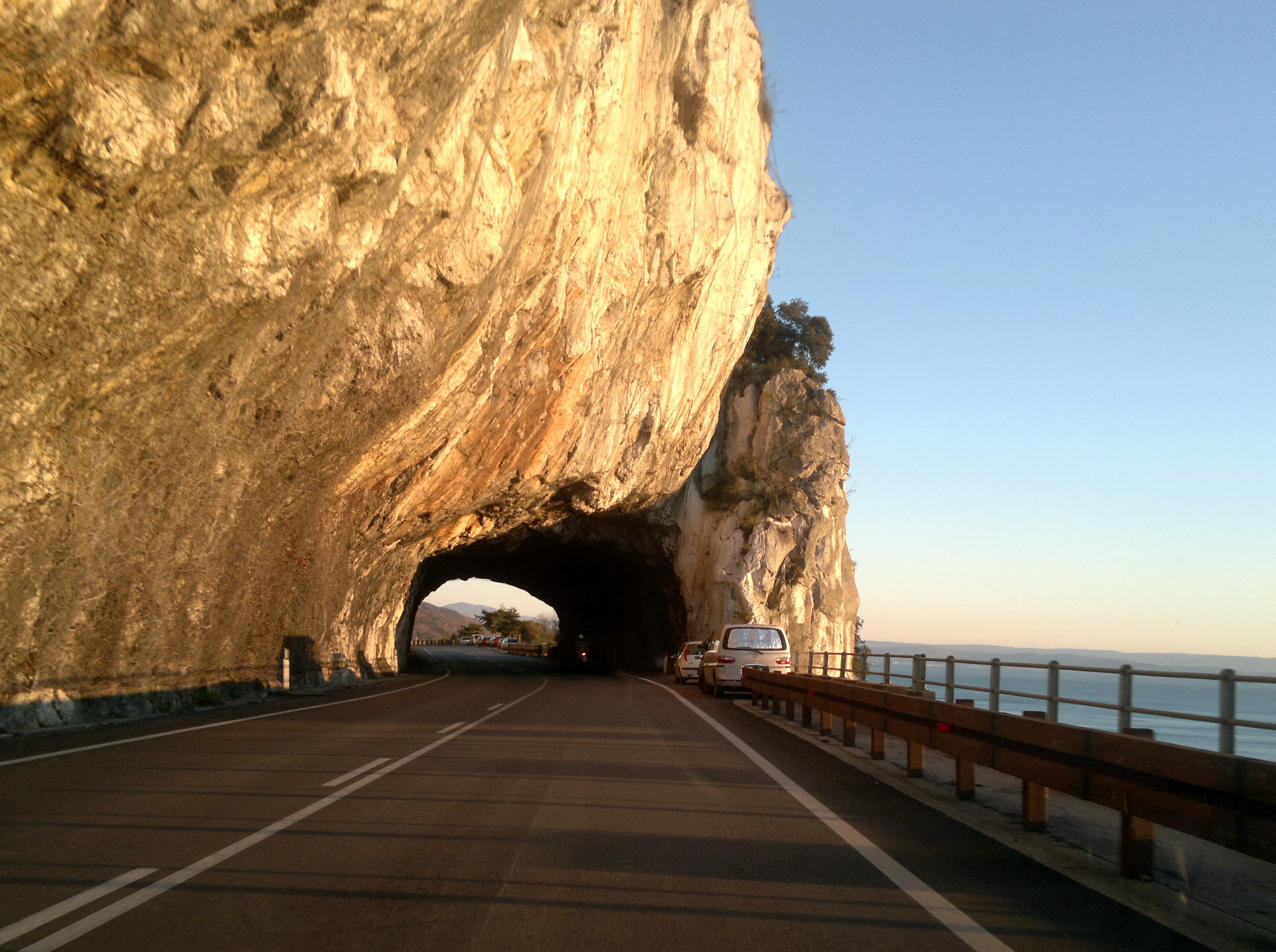
European route 61 near Trieste, Italy.

European route E61 forms part of the United Nations International E-road network, of which it is a Class A intermediate north–south route. 270 kilometres (170 mi) long, it connects the southern part of Austria to the Adriatic Sea.

== Itinerary ==
The E 61 routes through four European countries:

=== Austria ===
Karawanken Autobahn	Villach - Rosenbach – Karawanken Tunnel (Slovenia)

=== Slovenia ===
A2 motorway (Slovenia)	(Austria) Karawanken Tunnel – Hrušica - Jesenice - Kranj - Ljubljana (Ljubljana Ring Road)
A1 motorway (Slovenia)	Ljubljana - Vrhnika - Postojna - Divača
A3 motorway (Slovenia)	Divača - Sežana – (Italy) SS58

=== Italy ===
- SS 58: Fernetti - Villa Opicina - Trieste
- SS 14: Trieste - Basovizza - Pesek di Grozzana

=== Slovenia ===
- G7: Krvavi Potok - Kozina - Starod

=== Croatia ===
- D8: Pasjak border crossing - Rupa interchange
- A7: Rupa - Rijeka (A6 Orehovica interchange)
