= D404 road =

Road in Croatia

D404 state road

Route information
- Length: 4.3 km (2.7 mi)

Major junctions
- From: A7 in Draga interchange
- D8 in Rijeka
- To: Port of Rijeka - Brajdica container cargo terminal

Location
- Country: Croatia
- Counties: Primorje-Gorski Kotar
- Major cities: Rijeka

Highway system
- Highways in Croatia

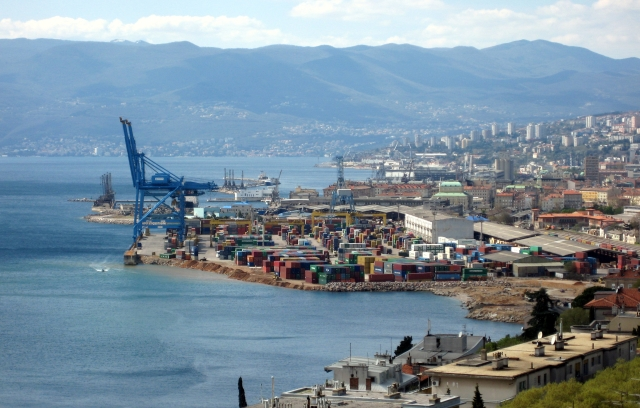
Port of Rijeka - Brajdica container cargo terminal, at the southern terminus of D404.

D404 is a state road connecting A7 motorway Draga interchange to the eastern part of the city of Rijeka, and to the Port of Rijeka, Brajdica container cargo terminal. The road is 3.5 km (2.2 mi) long, and 60% of the route is carried by various structures, such as tunnels and viaducts. The road opening had a number of delays, even though associated construction works were virtually complete for a long time. In the meantime, the road was used as a parking space. Finally, on May 30, 2011, the D404 road was open to traffic considerably enhancing access to Brajdica and eastern parts of Rijeka. Approximately two thirds of the road are classified as an expressway with 3 lanes, although the section between Vežica and Draga interchanges has 4 lanes.

A connection to Rijeka Tower Centre is also provided from the road (northbound only), from within Pećine Tunnel.

As with all state roads in Croatia, the D404 too is managed and maintained by Hrvatske ceste, state owned company.

== Road junctions and populated areas ==
D404 junctions/populated areas
Type	Slip roads/Notes
	A7 - Draga interchange - connection to Rijeka, A6 motorway and A8 motorway to the west and to Sveti Kuzam interchange to the east. The northern terminus of the road.
	Vežica interchange (no exit for northbound traffic)
	Pećine Tunnel - 1,341 m (4,400 ft) long. Tunnel exit to Rijeka Tower Centre (northbound traffic only).
	Port of Rijeka - Brajdica container cargo terminal.
	D8 to Rijeka. The D8 state road forms numerous intersections in the city of Rijeka itself. The southern terminus of the road.

== See also ==
- Autocesta Rijeka - Zagreb
