= D304 road =

Road in Croatia

D304 state road

Route information
- Length: 7.1 km (4.4 mi)

Major junctions
- From: Kastav
- A7 in Diračje interchange
- To: D8 in Rijeka

Location
- Country: Croatia
- Counties: Primorje-Gorski Kotar
- Major cities: Kastav, Rijeka

Highway system
- Highways in Croatia

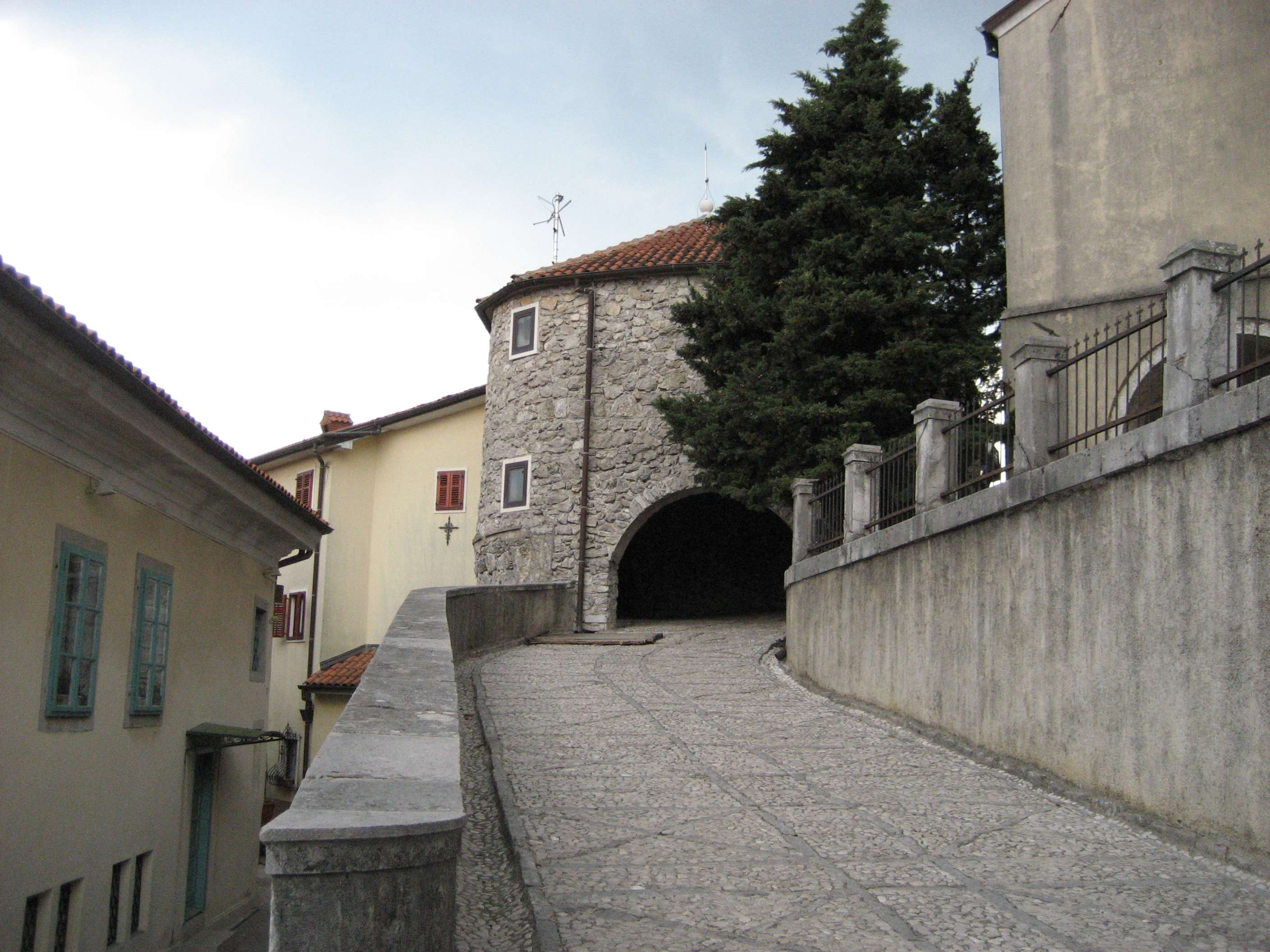
Kastav, at the northern terminus of D304.

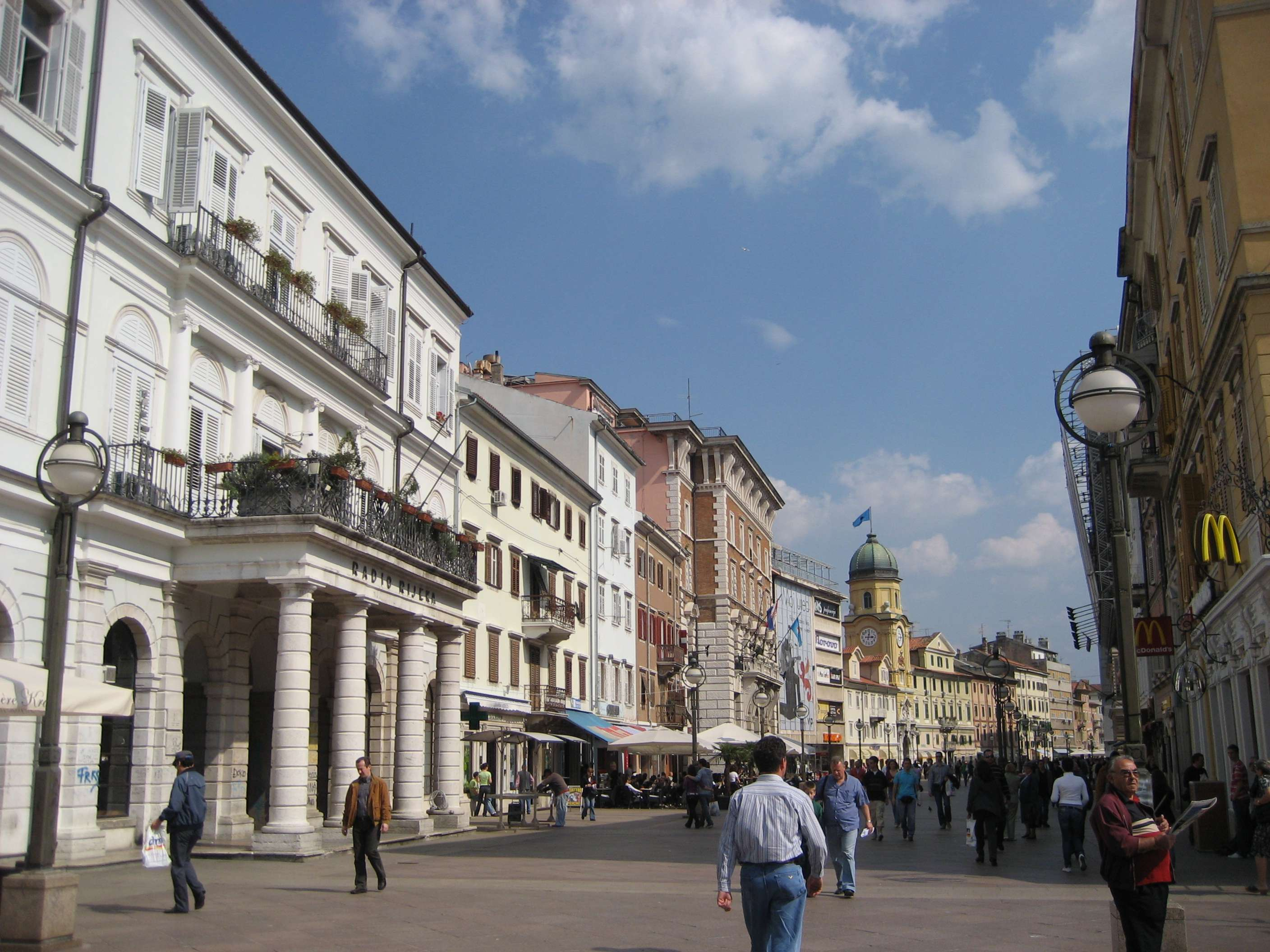
Rijeka, at the southern terminus of D304.

D304 is a state road connecting Kastav and parts of Rijeka with A7 motorway in Diračje interchange and terminating at D8 state road in Rijeka. The road is 7.1 km long.

D304 is fully incorporated in Rijeka and Kastav urban transportation systems.

The road, as well as all other state roads in Croatia, is managed and maintained by Hrvatske ceste, state owned company.

== Road junctions and populated areas ==
D304 junctions/populated areas
Type	Slip roads/Notes
	Kastav: Ž5021 to Viškovo; Ž5047 to Matulji; L58042 to Čikovići; Northern terminus of the road.
	Rijeka: L58043 to Ž5047; L58044 to Ž5025
	A7, in Diračje interchange
	Rijeka: City centre D8 state road to Matulji to the west and to Rijeka city centre to the east. Southern terminus of the road.

== See also ==
- State roads in Croatia
- Hrvatske ceste
- Autocesta Rijeka - Zagreb
