= Rukavac =

Rukavac may refer to:

- Rukavac, Primorje-Gorski Kotar County, a village near Matulji, Croatia
- Rukavac, Split-Dalmatia County, a village on Vis, Croatia
