= Permani =

Coordinates: 45°25′N 14°18′E

- Village
- Interactive map of Permani
- Country: Croatia
- County: Primorje-Gorski Kotar County

Area
  - Total: 1.0 km^{2} (0.39 sq mi)

Population (2021)
  - Total: 104
  - Density: 100/km^{2} (270/sq mi)
- Time zone: UTC+1 (CET)
  - Summer (DST): UTC+2 (CEST)

Permani is a village in Primorje-Gorski Kotar County, Croatia. Administratively it belongs to the municipality of Matulji. The village is connected by the D8 highway.
