= Verige bridge =

- Coordinates: 42°28′40″N 18°41′16″E
- Carries: 4-lane motorway and two pedestrian sidewalks.
- Crosses: Bay of Kotor
- Locale: Montenegro

Characteristics
- Design: Cable-stayed bridge
- Total length: 981 metres (3,219 ft)
- Width: 22.91 metres (75.2 ft)
- Longest span: 450 metres (1,480 ft)

Location
- Interactive map of Verige bridge

The Verige bridge (Montenegrin: Мост Вериге, Most Verige) is a planned bridge in Montenegro that would span the Bay of Kotor, crossing the Verige Strait at its narrowest point. It will be part of the Adriatic Highway (Jadranska magistrala). As of 2007, the planning stage of the bridge is completed, and construction of the bridge can begin upon the providing of the financial means. The project is estimated to cost 48.5 million US dollars. Because the Kotor Bay is a UNESCO World Heritage Site, UNESCO has had some concerns regarding this project.

Following a recommendation of the World Heritage Committee the Government of Montenegro is expected to consider alternative ways of crossing the bay. In particular, a tunnel passage is reported to be under consideration:

In the upcoming period, the Government is expected to determine the best way of passage through the Bay of Kotor, whether with a bridge or a tunnel, taking into account the recommendations and suggestions of UNESCO Mission, the Parliament conclusion and the decision of municipalities in the Bay of Kotor. After that, the optimal passage solution will be adopted, the one which will exalt best both the development and touristic potential of the state of Montenegro and the interest of its citizens, as well as the aspects of the protection of the World Heritage area of Kotor.

— Branislav Mićunović
