= Rukavac, Primorje-Gorski Kotar County =

Village in Croatia

Rukavac
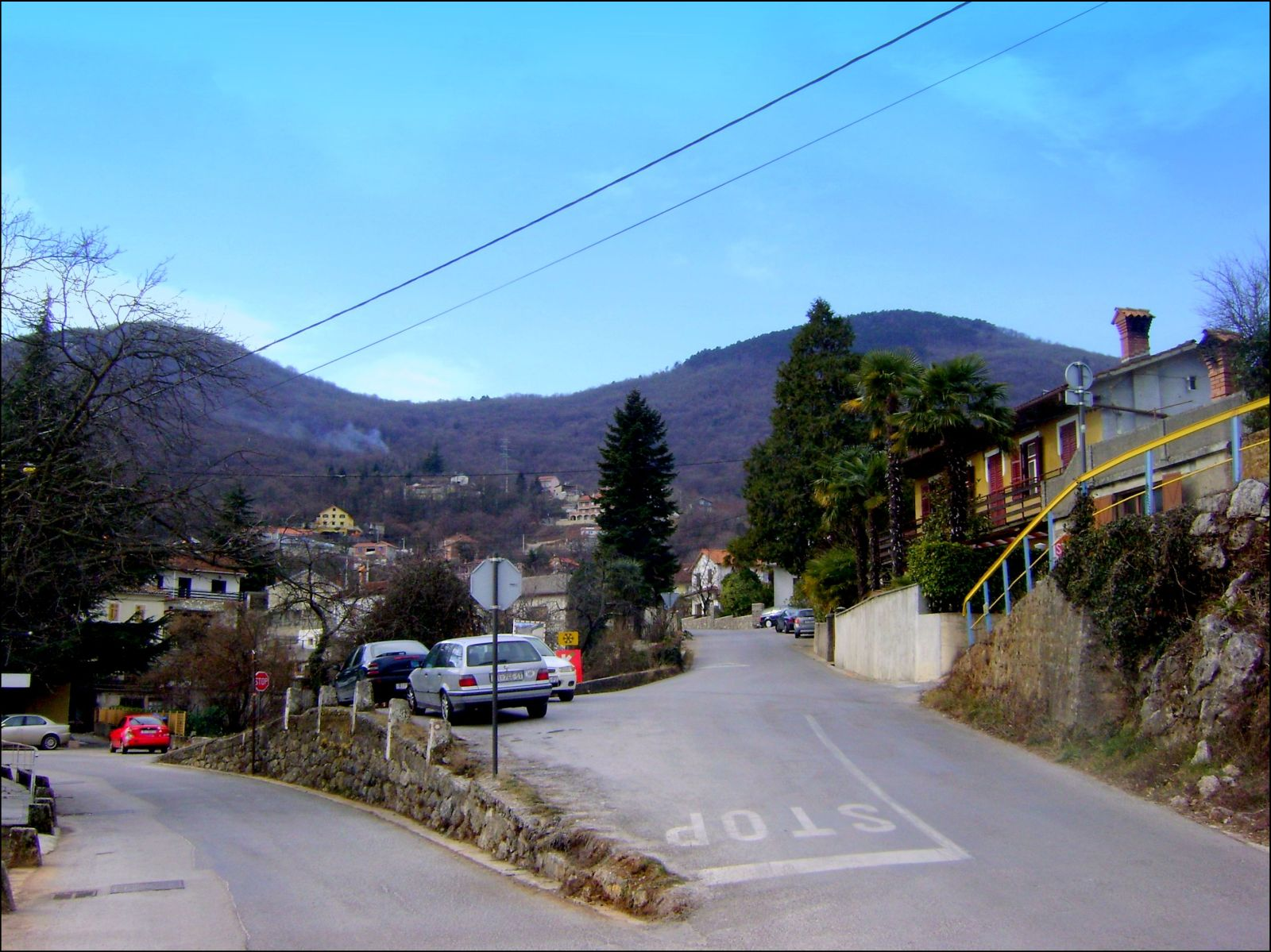

- Location within Croatia
- Coordinates: 45°21′54″N 14°18′00″E
- Country: Croatia
- County: Primorje-Gorski Kotar
- Municipality: Matulji

Area
  - Total: 12.6 km^{2} (4.9 sq mi)

Population (2021)
  - Total: 833
  - Density: 66.1/km^{2} (171/sq mi)
- Time zone: UTC+1 (CET)
  - Summer (DST): UTC+2 (CEST)

Rukavac is a village in western Croatia. It is located in the Primorje-Gorski Kotar County and administratively belongs to the municipality of Matulji. Opatija is also a nearby town.
