= Zaton Doli =

- Settlement
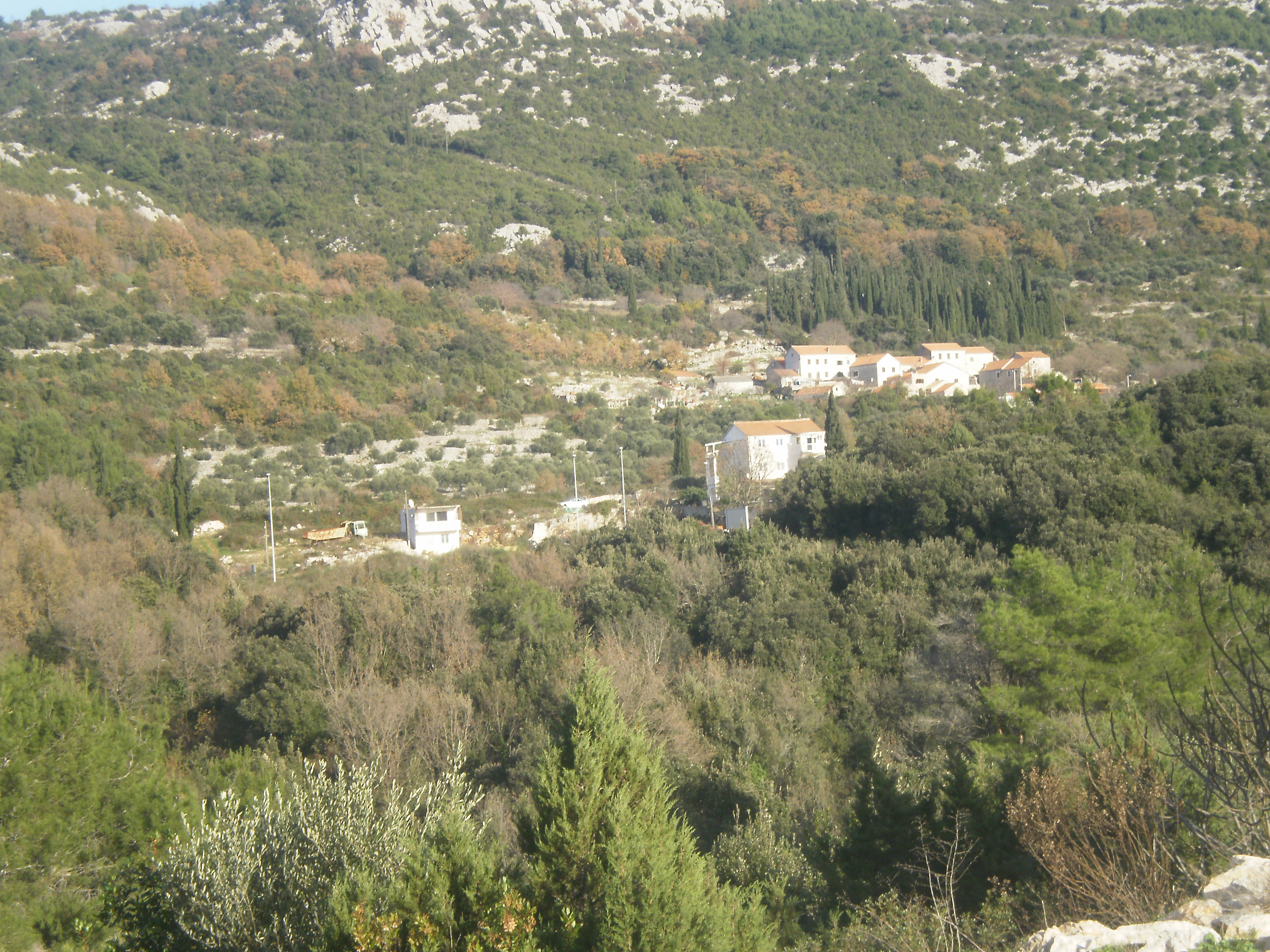

- Location within Croatia
- Coordinates: 42°49′48″N 17°45′43″E
- Country: Croatia
- County: Dubrovnik-Neretva County
- Municipality: Ston

Area
  - Total: 3.0 sq mi (7.7 km^{2})

Population (2021)
  - Total: 56
  - Density: 19/sq mi (7.3/km^{2})
- Time zone: UTC+1 (CET)
  - Summer (DST): UTC+2 (CEST)
- Postal code: 20230 Ston

Zaton Doli is a village in Croatia, on the border with Neum, Bosnia and Herzegovina. It is connected by the D8 highway.

== Demographics ==
According to the 2021 census, its population was 56. It was 61 in 2011.

Villages and former villages under Zaton Doli include:

- Mali Voz
