= Jelšane =

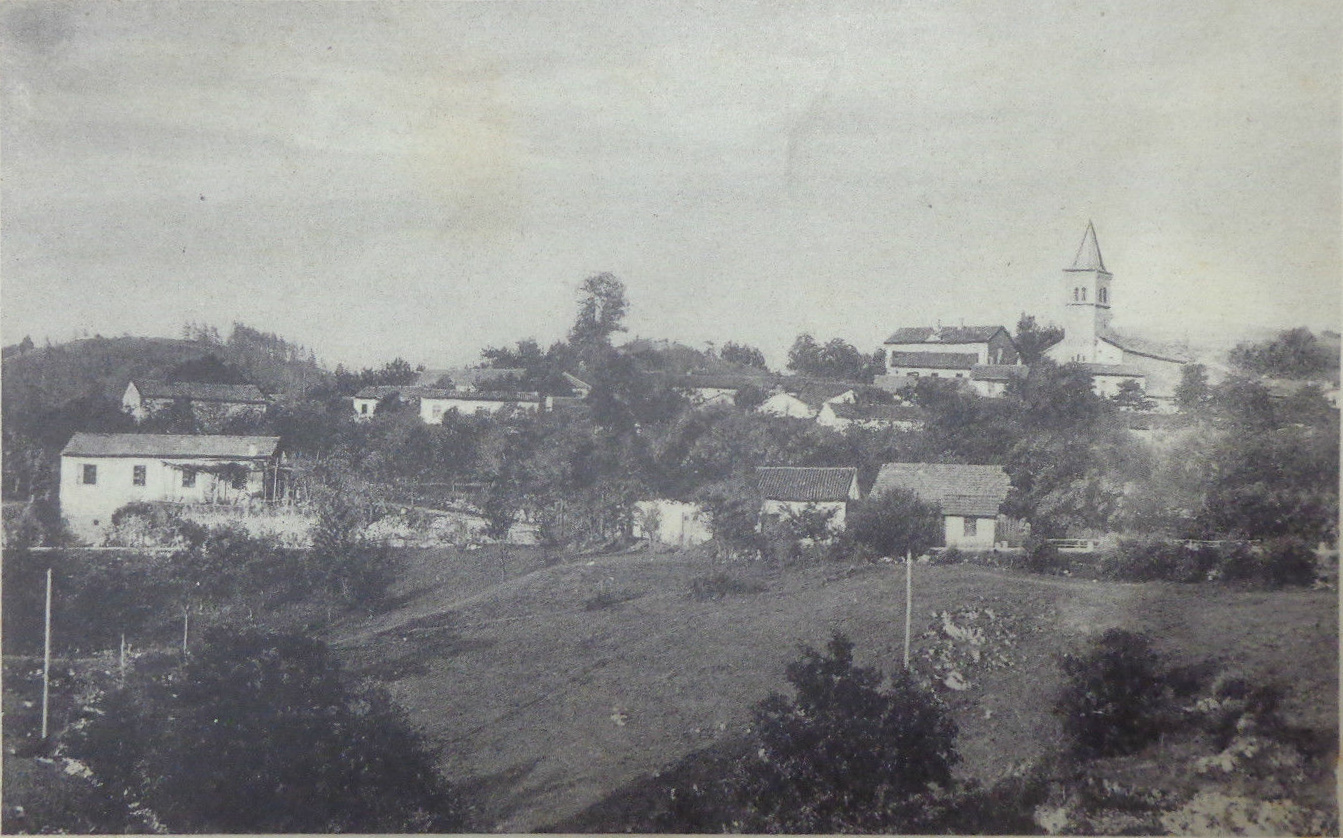
- 1934 postcard of Jelšane

- Location in Slovenia
- Coordinates: 45°30′1.61″N 14°16′16.92″E
- Country: Slovenia
- Traditional region: Inner Carniola
- Statistical region: Littoral–Inner Carniola
- Municipality: Ilirska Bistrica

Area
  - Total: 6.34 km^{2} (2.45 sq mi)
- Elevation: 498.5 m (1,635 ft)

Population (2002)
  - Total: 293

Jelšane (pronounced [jɛu̯ˈʃaːnɛ]; Italian: Elsane) is a village in the Municipality of Ilirska Bistrica in the Inner Carniola region of Slovenia, right on the border with Croatia. The Jelšane international border crossing between Slovenia and Croatia is just south of the village. The Croatian settlement opposite Jelšane is Rupa in the municipality of Matulji. After Slovenia joined the Schengen area on December 21, 2007, the Rupa–Jelšane route was a Schengen external border crossing until 2023.

== Mass graves ==
Jelšane is the site of six known mass graves or clandestine graves from the end of the Second World War. Most contain the remains of German soldiers from the 97th Corps that fell at the beginning of May 1945. The Cemetery Wall Mass Grave (Slovene: Grobišče za pokopališkim zidom) is located next to the west side of the cemetery wall and contains the remains of an unknown number of soldiers. The Kršnjak Mass Grave (Grobišče Kršnjak) is located about 120 m east of the village cemetery and contains the remains of six prisoners of war. The Brežine Mass Grave (Grobišče Brežine), also known as the Lokva Mass Grave (Grobišče Pri Lokvi), is located on the east edge of the village and contains the remains of six prisoners of war. The Christmas Valley Grave (Grob Božična vala) is located in the woods east of the village and contains the remains of one soldier. The Branček Grave (Grobišče Branček), also known as the Šušnjak Grave (Grobišče Šušnjak), is located on the south side of the road east of the village at a former lime kiln and contains the remains of one soldier. The Little Bridge Grave (Grob pri mostiču) is located at the crossroads south of the settlement. It contains the remains of an Italian officer killed by German soldiers.

== Church ==
The parish church in the settlement is dedicated to the Assumption of Mary and belongs to the Koper Diocese.
