= Orehovica interchange =

Trumpet interchange in Rijeka, Croatia

- Croatian: čvor Orehovica
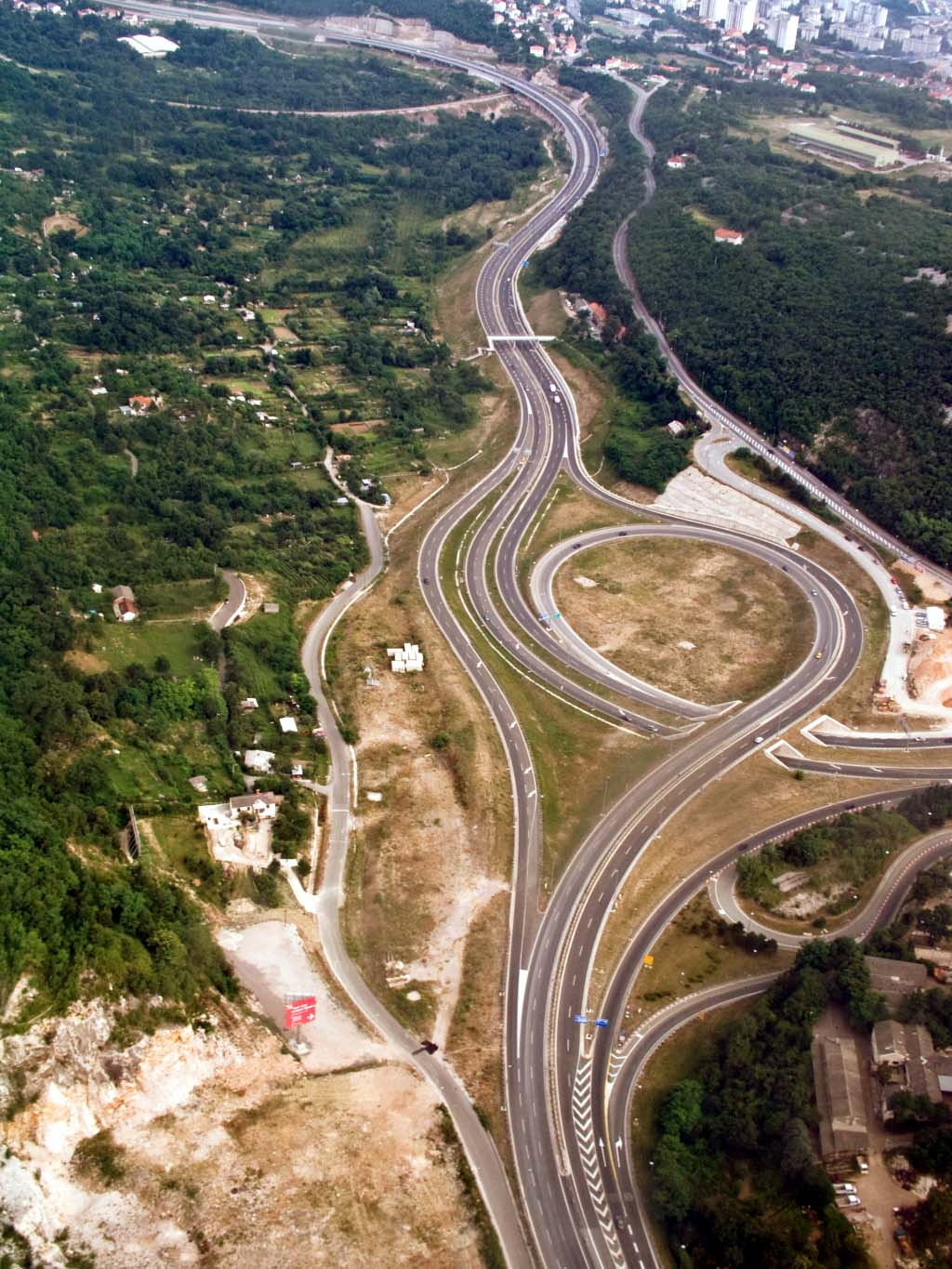
- Orehovica interchange, the southern terminus of the A6 motorway

Location
- Rijeka, Croatia
- Coordinates: 45.337366°N 14.471097°E
- Roads at junction: A6; A7

Construction
- Type: Trumpet interchange

The Orehovica interchange (Croatian: Čvor Orehovica) is a trumpet interchange in Rijeka, Croatia. The interchange represents the southern terminus of the A6 motorway and it connects the A6 route to the A7 motorway between Škurinje and Draga exits, also representing a part of Rijeka bypass. The interchange is a part of Pan-European corridor Vb. It also represents a junction of European routes E61 and E65.

The interchange was originally executed as Zagreb–Rijeka motorway terminus exit, connecting the motorway to the city of Rijeka itself directly. Following construction of Rijeka bypass towards Škurinje (westward), the interchange was expanded, but it was still used as a motorway exit. Once the bypass, i.e. A7 motorway, was extended eastward to Sveti Kuzam, the motorway exit was scheduled to be cancelled. A subsequent intervention into the design documents allowed preservation of one directional ramp facilitating exit from the southbound A6 motorway at the interchange.

== See also ==
- Bosiljevo 2 interchange
- International E-road network
- Transport in Croatia
