= Starod =

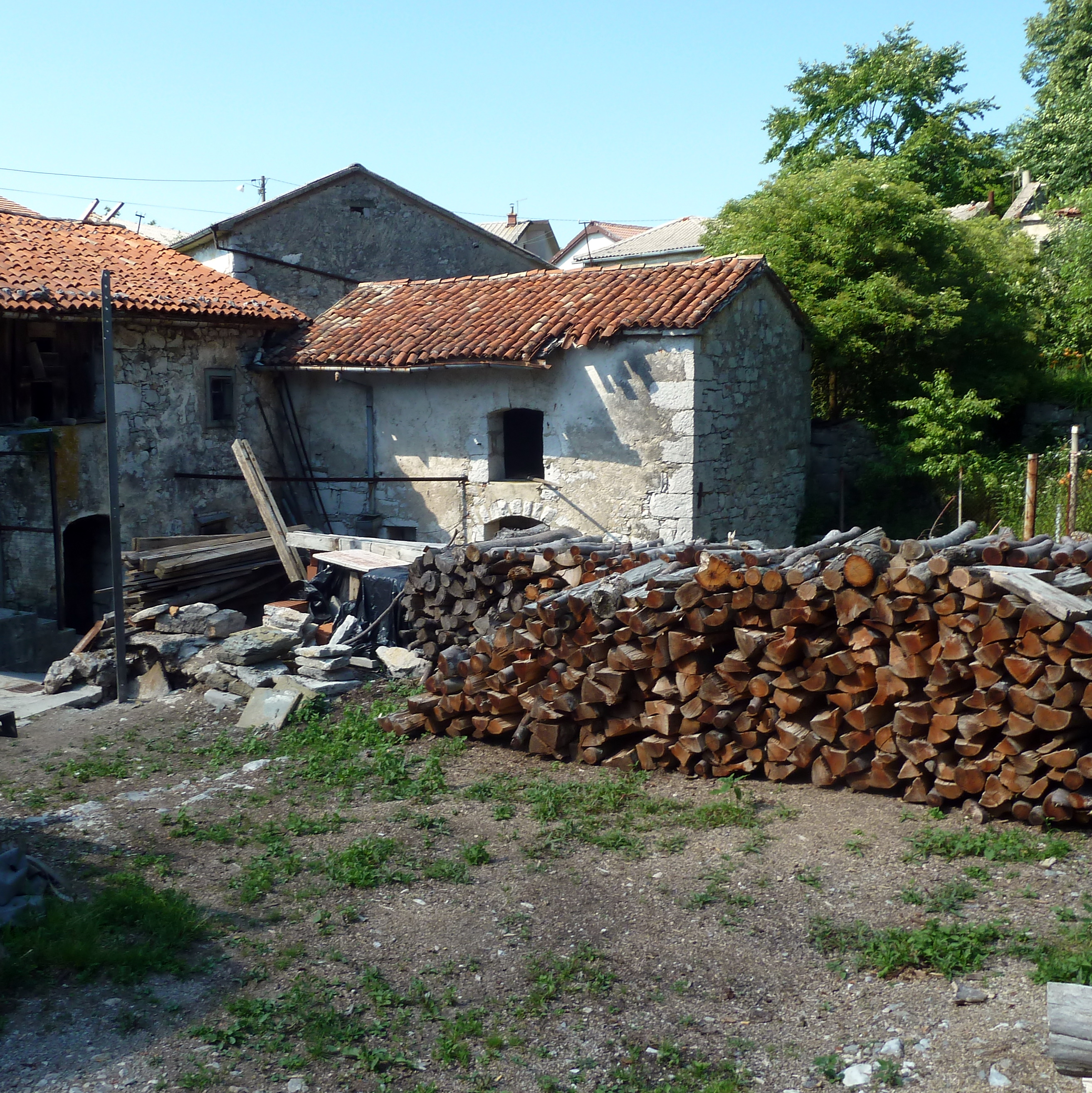

- Location in Slovenia
- Coordinates: 45°29′56.21″N 14°11′41.99″E
- Country: Slovenia
- Traditional region: Littoral
- Statistical region: Littoral–Inner Carniola
- Municipality: Ilirska Bistrica

Area
  - Total: 11.59 km^{2} (4.47 sq mi)
- Elevation: 738.8 m (2,424 ft)

Population (2002)
  - Total: 49

Starod (pronounced [ˈstaːɾɔt]; Italian: Starada) is a village in the Municipality of Ilirska Bistrica in the traditional Littoral region of Slovenia, on the border with Croatia.

The local church in the settlement is dedicated to Saint Joseph and belongs to the Parish of Podgrad.
