= Jurdani =

Coordinates: 45°23′N 14°19′E

- Village
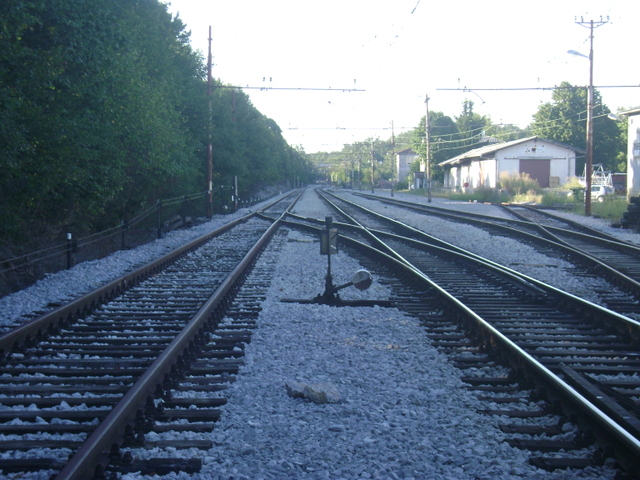
- Jurdani train station
- Interactive map of Jurdani
- Country: Croatia
- County: Primorje-Gorski Kotar County

Area
  - Total: 4.2 km^{2} (1.6 sq mi)

Population (2021)
  - Total: 658
  - Density: 160/km^{2} (410/sq mi)
- Time zone: UTC+1 (CET)
  - Summer (DST): UTC+2 (CEST)

Jurdani (Italian: Giordani) is a village in Matulji located in the municipality of western Croatia.
