= Debeli Brijeg =

Mountain in Montenegro

Coordinates: 42°29′14.6″N 18°26′15.3″E

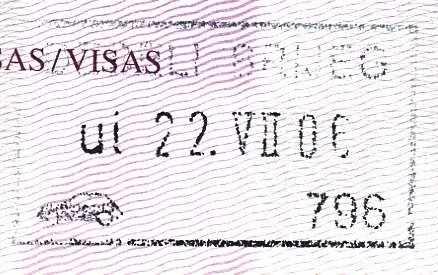
Passport stamp a month after Montenegro declared independence.

Debeli Brijeg is the main Montenegrin border crossing with Croatia. The Croatian checkpoint is known as Karasovići. It is located on the Adriatic Highway.

Debeli Brijeg is in Herceg Novi municipality about 6 km from Igalo.
