= Žuta Lokva =

Coordinates: 44°58′N 15°04′E

- Village
- Interactive map of Žuta Lokva
- Location within Croatia
- Country: Croatia
- Region: Lika
- County: Lika-Senj
- Municipality: Brinje

Area
  - Total: 1.6 sq mi (4.1 km^{2})

Population (2021)
  - Total: 16
  - Density: 10/sq mi (3.9/km^{2})
- Time zone: UTC+1 (CET)
  - Summer (DST): UTC+2 (CEST)

Žuta Lokva is a village in Brinje, Croatia. It is connected by the D23 road.
