= Križišće =

Coordinates: 45°16′N 14°36′E

- Village
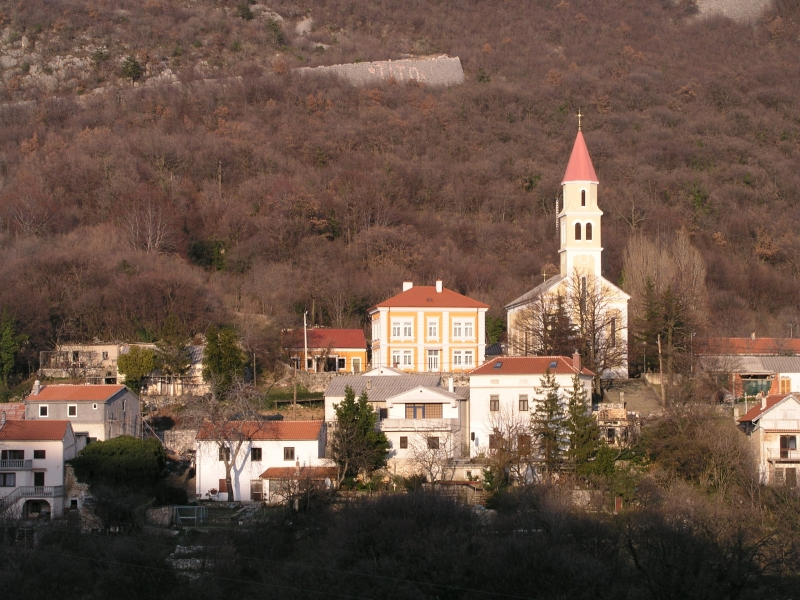
- Interactive map of Križišće
- Country: Croatia

Area
  - Total: 0.077 sq mi (0.2 km^{2})

Population (2021)
  - Total: 79
  - Density: 1,000/sq mi (390/km^{2})
- Time zone: UTC+1 (CET)
  - Summer (DST): UTC+2 (CEST)

Križišće is a village in Croatia. It is connected by the D501 highway.

It is in Primorje-Gorski Kotar County. Many roads go through Križišće which is where the village gets its name from. It lies very close to the Krk bridge.

== Governance ==
=== Local ===
It is the seat of the Local Committee of Križišće, encompassing itself, Mali Dol and Veli Dol.
