= Rupa, Croatia =

Rupa
- Location within Croatia
- Coordinates: 45°28′41″N 14°17′10″E
- Country: Croatia
- County: Primorje-Gorski Kotar
- Municipality: Matulji

Area
  - Total: 5.5 km^{2} (2.1 sq mi)

Population (2021)
  - Total: 345
  - Density: 63/km^{2} (160/sq mi)
- Time zone: UTC+1 (CET)
  - Summer (DST): UTC+2 (CEST)

Rupa (Italian: Ruppa) is a village in northwest Croatia near its border with Slovenia. It is located in Matulji (Italian: Mattuglie) municipality in Primorje-Gorski Kotar County, 17 km from the town of Matulji. It has a population of 310 (census 2001) and an area of 5.5 km^{2}.

Rupa is a major border crossing between the two countries where Croatia's Autocesta A7 motorway connects with Slovenia's Highway 7. The Slovenian town opposite Rupa is Jelšane in Ilirska Bistrica municipality. With Slovenia joining the Schengen area on December 21, 2007, Rupa-Jelšane became a Schengen external border crossing.
