= Pasjak, Matulji =

Pasjak
- Village
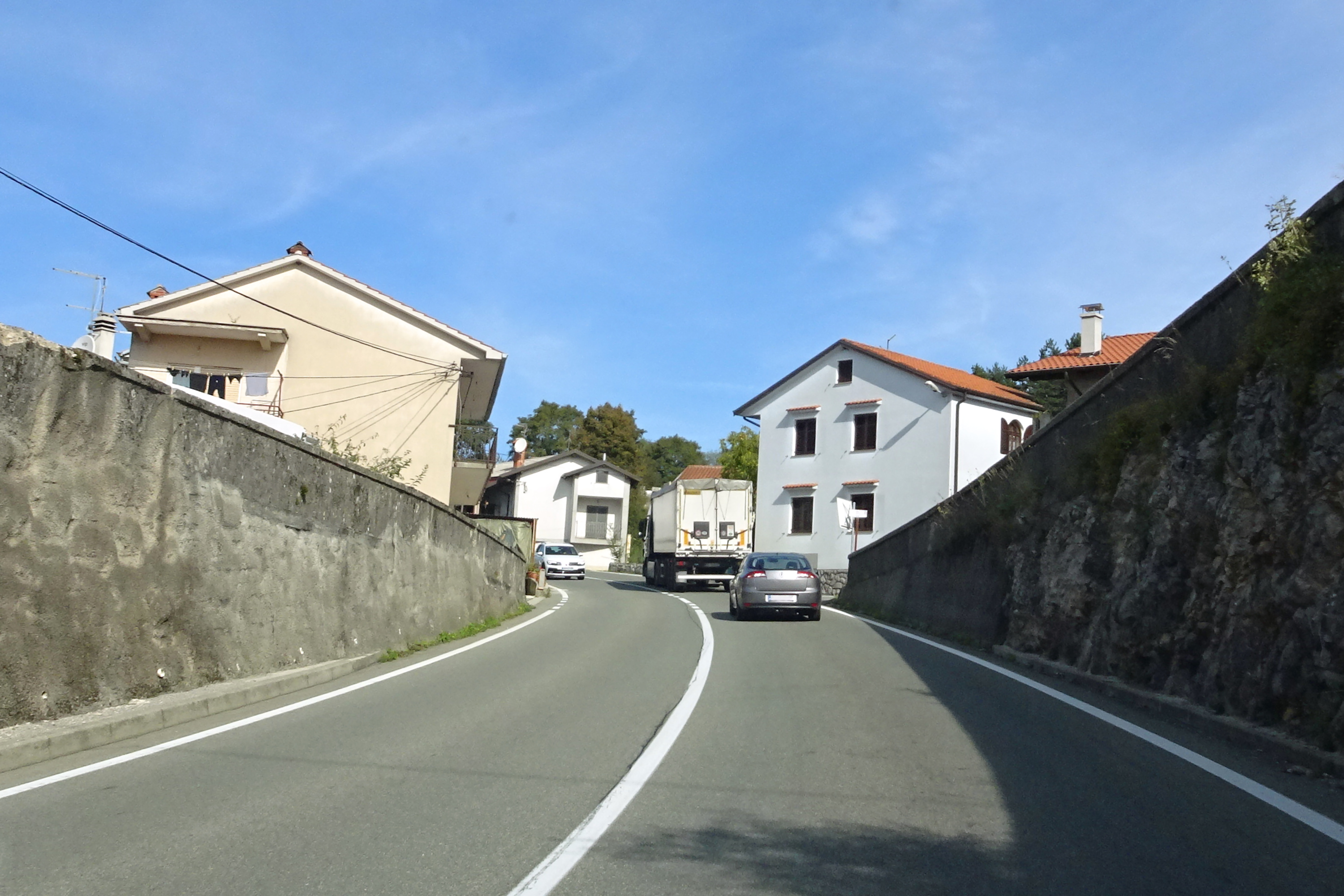
- D8 through Pasjak

- Location within Croatia
- Coordinates: 45°29′N 14°14′E
- Country: Croatia
- County: Primorje-Gorski Kotar County

Area
  - Total: 10.9 km^{2} (4.2 sq mi)

Population (2021)
  - Total: 132
  - Density: 12.1/km^{2} (31.4/sq mi)
- Time zone: UTC+1 (CET)
  - Summer (DST): UTC+2 (CEST)

Pasjak (Italian: Passiacco) is a village in Croatia, located on the border with Slovenia. Just north of the village is the northern endpoint of the D8 highway, at the eponymous Pasjak border crossing. The village is part of the Matulji municipality, in Primorje-Gorski Kotar County.
