= Matulji =

- Municipality
- Matulji Municipality; Općina Matulji
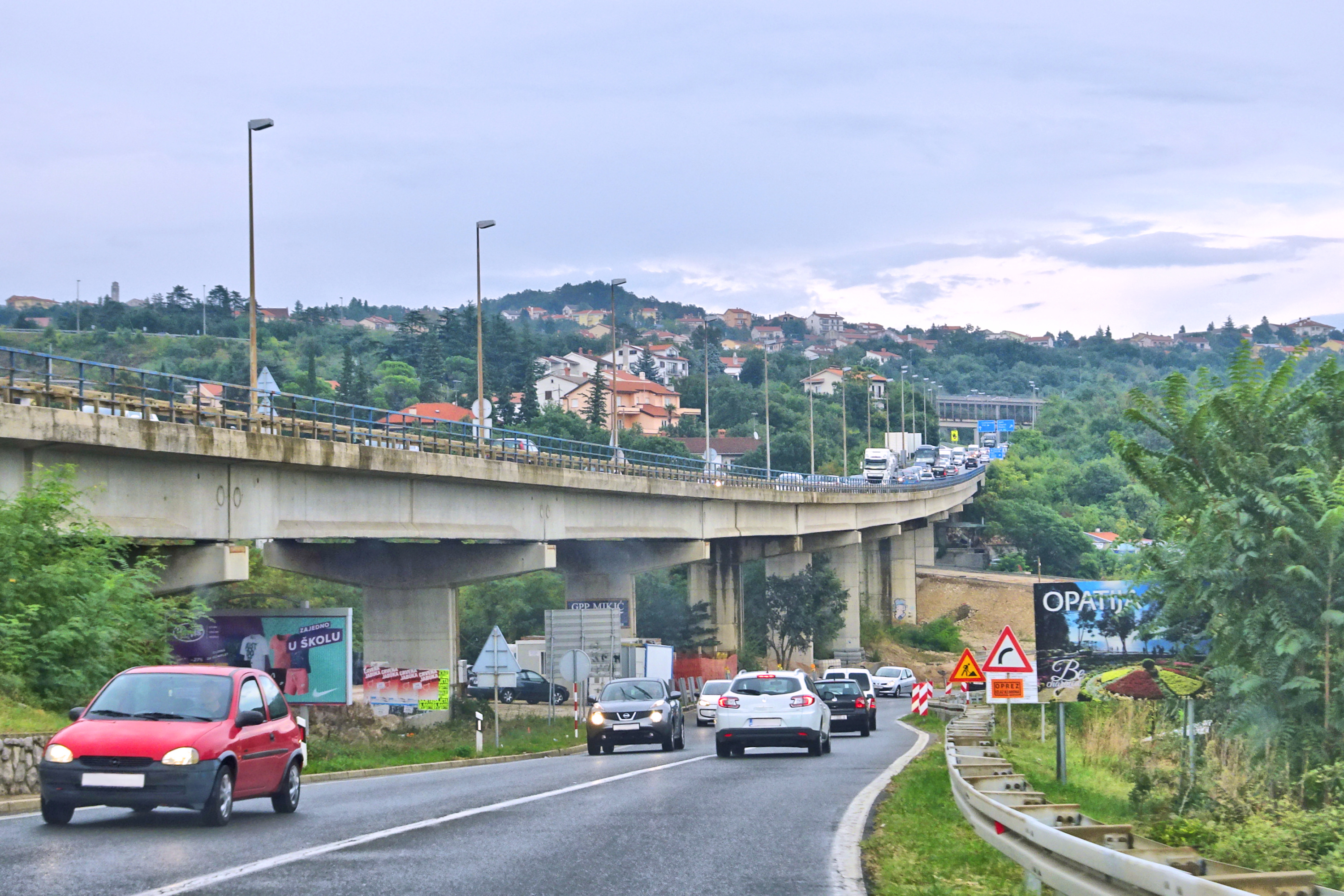

- Flag

- Location within Croatia
- Coordinates: 45°22′N 14°19′E
- Country: Croatia
- County: Primorje-Gorski Kotar County

Government
  - Mayor: Ingrid Debeuc (PGS)
  - Municipal council: 17 members: SDP-PGS-IDS-HSU (8); HDZ (3); _; AM (2); _; Independents (2); _; HNS (1); _; ŽZ (1)

Area
  - Municipality: 176.6 km^{2} (68.2 sq mi)
  - Urban: 3.0 km^{2} (1.2 sq mi)

Population (2021)
  - Municipality: 10,773
  - Density: 61.00/km^{2} (158.0/sq mi)
  - Urban: 3,566
  - Urban density: 1,200/km^{2} (3,100/sq mi)
- Time zone: UTC+1 (CET)
  - Summer (DST): UTC+2 (CEST)
- Postal code: 51211
- Area code: 051
- Vehicle registration: RI
- Website: matulji.hr

Matulji is a municipality in Primorje-Gorski Kotar County, northwestern Croatia. It is located 10 kilometers (6 mi) west of the city of Rijeka, north of the town of Opatija, and it borders Slovenia. Matulji is first mentioned in written historical sources in the middle of the 17th century, and it is preceded by the surname Matulja, which was originally recorded as Matuglia. As early as the beginning of the 19th century, official documents recorded the name of the settlement in its current form – Matulji.

== Municipality ==
In the 2011 census, there were a total of 11,246 inhabitants in the municipality, in the following settlements:

- Brdce, population 67
- Bregi, population 700
- Brešca, population 159
- Jurdani, population 651
- Jušići, population 861
- Kućeli, population 455
- Lipa, population 129
- Male Mune, population 103
- Mali Brgud, population 134
- Matulji, population 3,731
- Mihotići, population 1,050
- Mučići, population 362
- Pasjak, population 140
- Permani, population 102
- Rukavac, population 854
- Rupa, population 349
- Ružići, population 123
- Šapjane, population 188
- Vele Mune, population 122
- Veli Brgud, population 485
- Zaluki, population 73
- Zvoneće, population 279
- Žejane, population 130

In the 2011 census, 90.87% were Croats.

== Transport ==
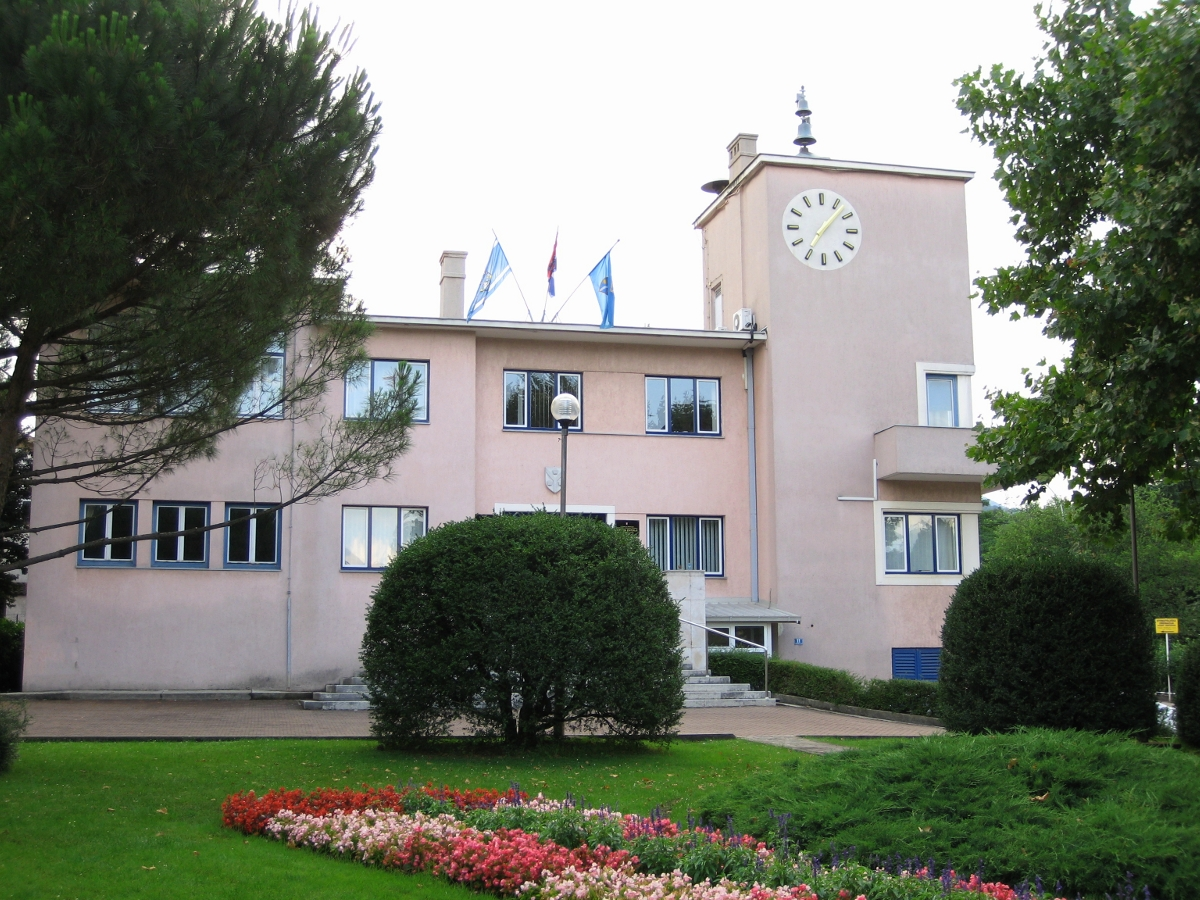
Municipal building of Matulji

The municipality is of great transportation importance because of the major railway and highway networks connecting Rijeka with Ljubljana and Trieste to the west, Zagreb and Split to the east and Pula to the south through the Učka tunnel. Sixty five percent of the annual Croatian border traffic takes place through four international border crossings - Pasjak (with Starod in Ilirska Bistrica municipality on the Slovenian side), Rupa (with Jelšane), Mune (with Starod), and Lipa (with Novokračine) - within the Matulji municipality. Šapjane, a main railway crossing into Slovenia with Ilirska Bistrica) on the Slovenian side, is also in the municipality.

The Opatija - Matulji railway station, the principal railway station for Opatija and surrounding municipalities, was constructed and opened in 1873.

The A7 motorway starts in the northern part of the municipality, on the border crossing with Slovenia and connects with the A8 expressway at the south, next to Rijeka and Opatija.

== Folklore ==
The region is well known locally for its folklore, namely Zvončari during the carnival festivities.

== Notable people ==
- Zoran Marojević
- Brian Kamstra

== Sources ==
- Matulji Tourist Board
