= Sveti Kuzam =

Sveti Kuzam Bakar-dio
- Village
- Location of Sveti Kuzam within the city of Rijeka

- Location of Sveti Kuzam in Croatia
- Coordinates: 45°18′53″N 14°31′35″E
- Country: Croatia
- County: Primorje-Gorski Kotar County
- City: Rijeka

Government
  - Type: Local board
  - Body: Council of Sveti Kuzam Local Board

Population (2011)
  - Total: 240
- listed as Bakar
- Time zone: UTC+1 (CET)
  - Summer (DST): UTC+2 (CEST)

Sveti Kuzam is a village located between Bakar and Rijeka in Primorje-Gorski Kotar County, Croatia. The village is administered as a part of the City of Rijeka.

The village was recorded on the 2011 Croatian census as a settlement named "Bakar" with a population of 240. The 2006 law on administrative divisions mentions no other settlement within the City of Rijeka. On 27 February 2014, Rijeka city council passed a decision to annex the settlement (named "Bakar-dio (Sv. Kuzam")) to the settlement of Rijeka.
