= Lađa Marathon =

Traditional boats rowing competition

Lađa Marathon Maraton lađa
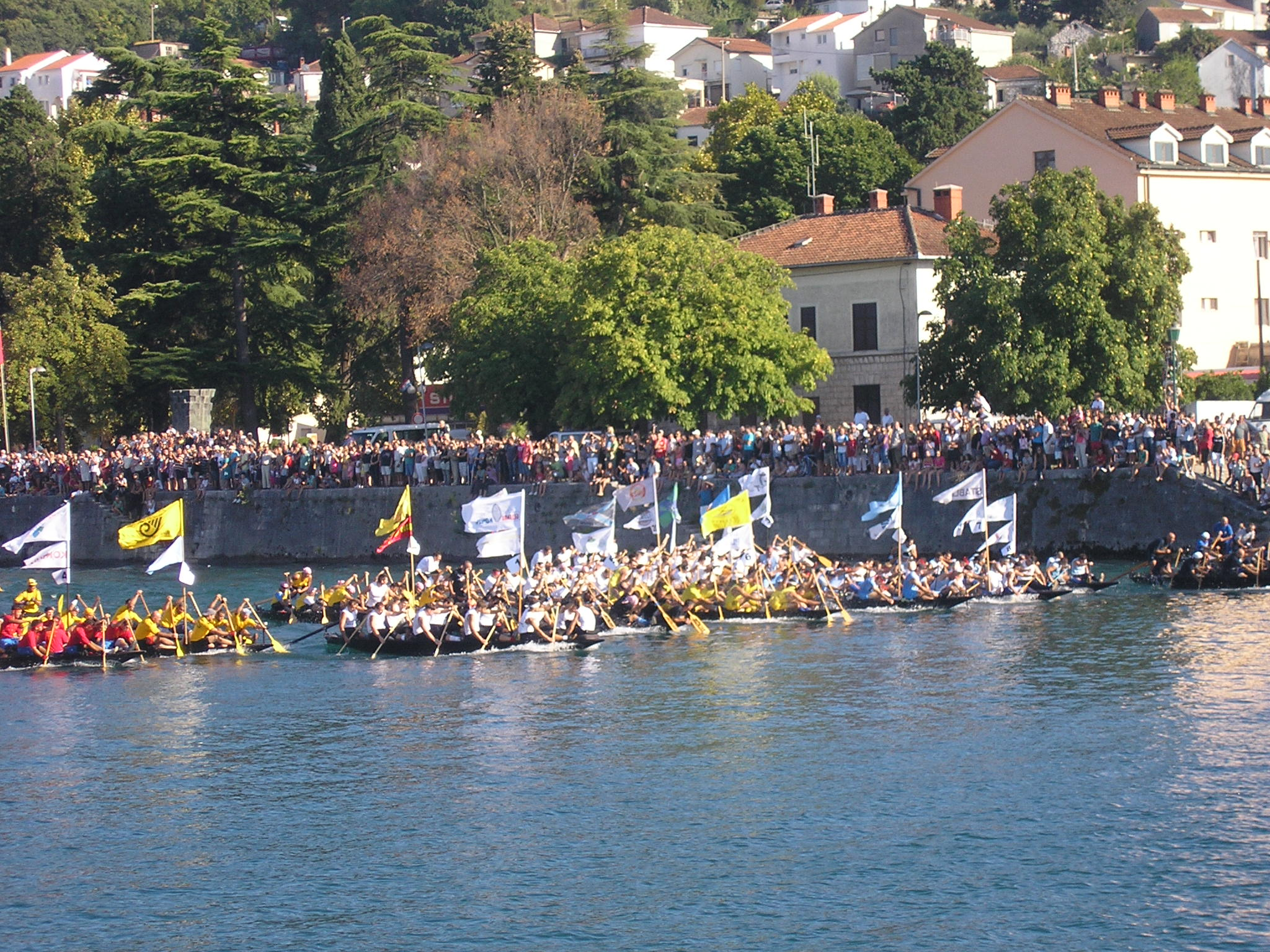
- Start of the race under the Lučki Bridge in Metković
- Status: Active
- Genre: Race of the traditional boats, Neretva lađa
- Frequency: Annually, second Saturday in August
- Locations: Metković − Opuzen − Ploče, Neretva Valley, Croatia
- Country: Croatia
- Inaugurated: September 13, 1998
- Most recent: August 8, 2026
- Participants: Approximately 30–40 crews
- Organiser: Udruga lađara Neretve
- Website: maraton-ladja.hr

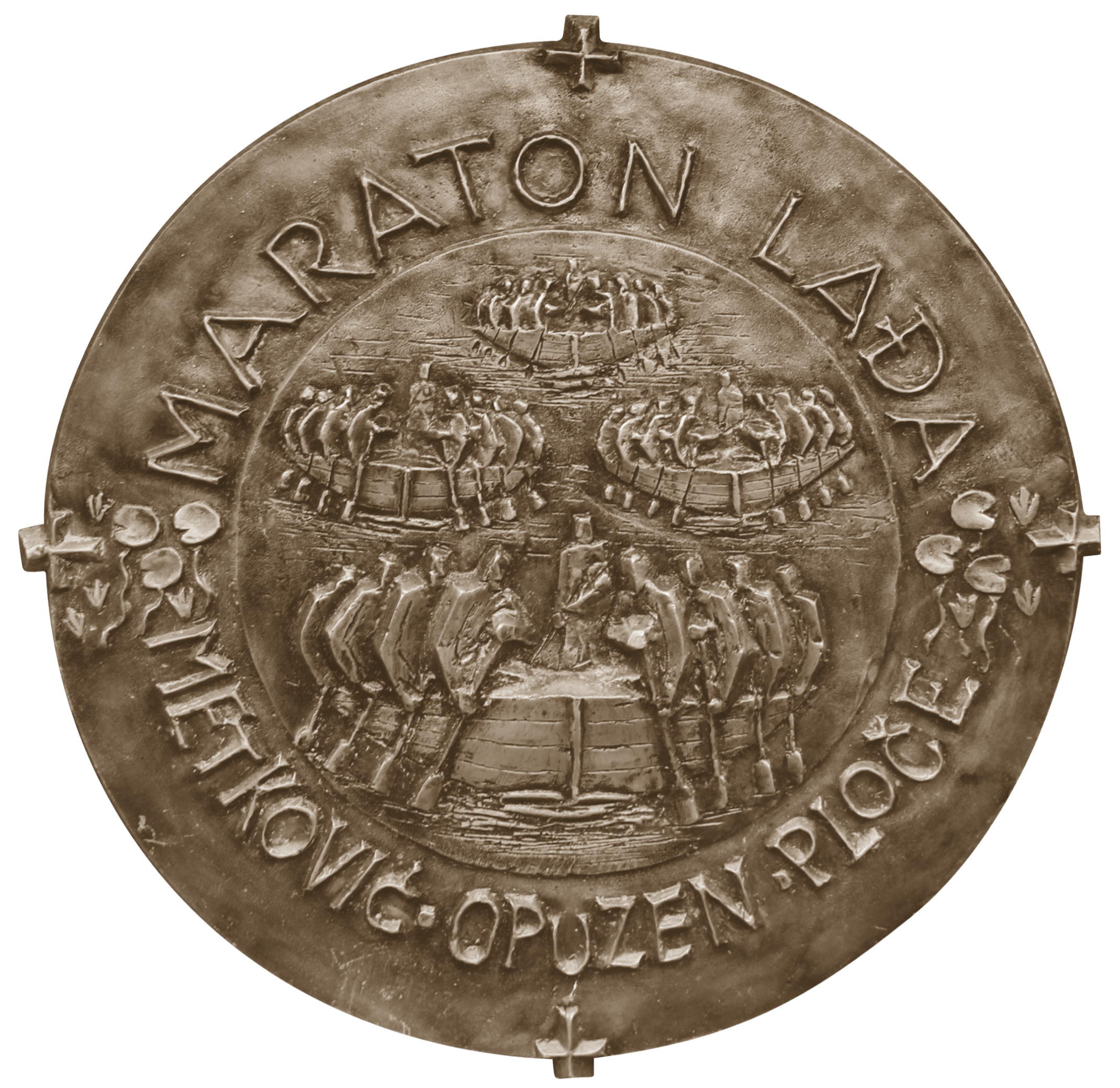
Transitional trophy for the winner of the competition, the shield of Duke Domagoj, the work of academic sculptor Nikola Vučković

The Lađa Marathon on the Neretva (Croatian: Maraton lađa na Neretvi) is an annual amateur traditional boats rowing competition held on the Neretva river in southern Croatia. Competitors race in traditional Neretvian boats known as lađa, wooden boats that historically served as a means of transportation and trade in the Neretva Valley.

The race is organized by the Neretva Boatmen Association (Udruga lađara Neretve) and is traditionally held on the second Saturday in August. The competition is held under the patronage of the President of Croatia.

== History ==
The Lađa Marathon was established in 1998 as a competition intended to preserve and promote the traditional Neretva boat, Neretva lađa and the rowing heritage of the Neretva Valley. The first race was held in September rather than August, but subsequent editions became an annual August event.

The first Lađa Maraton was held on 13 September 1998, marking the seventh anniversary of "Operation Zelena Tabla – Mala Bara", a Croatian War of Independence military operation conducted in the Neretva area.

The competition initially had a local character. In its early years, participation was primarily restricted to people originating from the Neretva Valley and their descendants. In 2005, the rules were changed to allow anyone to compete, which contributed to the expansion of the competition beyond the Neretva region.

The race subsequently attracted crews from other parts of Croatia, as well as competitors from abroad.

== Race ==
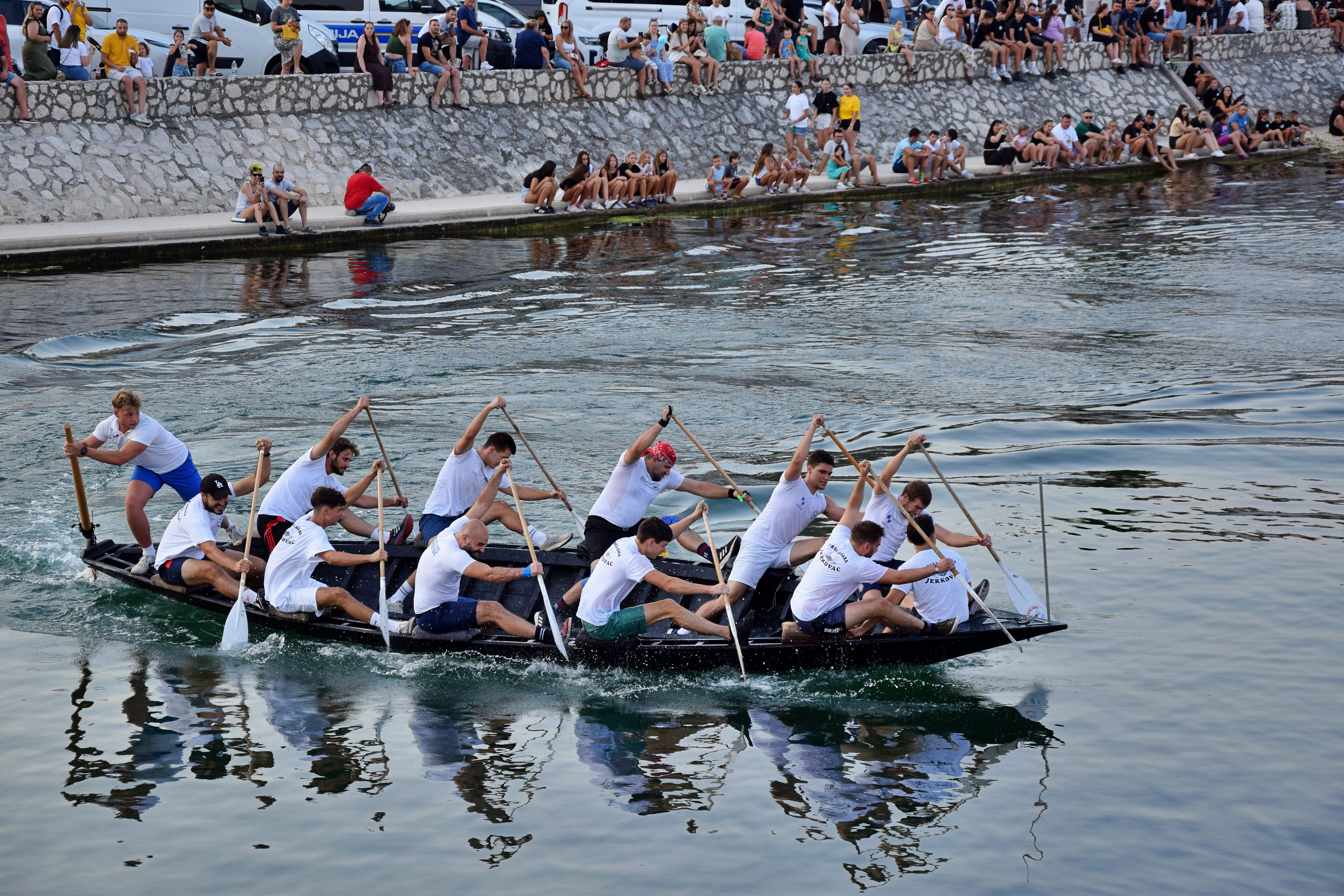
Competition for starting positions in Opuzen 2026

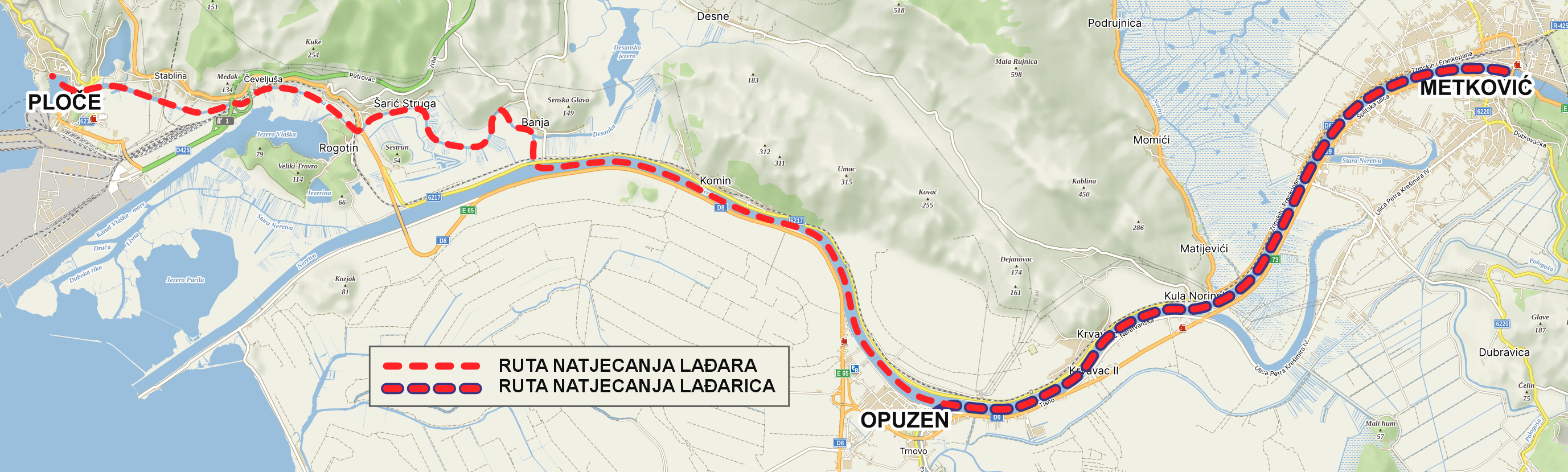
The route of the Lađa Marathon from Metković to Ploče. Red lines: Men's Marathon route; red lines with black outline: Women's Marathon route

The Lađa Marathon is one of the largest traditional-boat sporting events in Croatia. The race normally features around 30–40 crews, with each crew consisting of 12 to 18 competitors. Several tens of thousands of spectators follow the race along the Neretva River, from the riverbanks and from spectator boats.

The race starts beneath the Lučki Bridge in Metković and follows the Neretva downstream through Kula Norinska, Krvavac, Opuzen and Komin, and then further through the downstream of the Neretva river branch, the Crna rika river from Banja through Šarić Struga, Rogotin, Čeveljuša and Stablina, before finishing in Ploče. The course is approximately 22.5 kilometres long.

The starting positions are determined by a separate sprint competition "Kup Slobodne Dalmacije" held in Opuzen on Wednesday, four days before the marathon. Crews compete over a 300-metre course with one turn, using the same boat, oars and steer. The fastest crew is given the first choice of starting position in the marathon.

== The lađa and crews ==
The lađa is a traditional wooden boat characteristic of the Neretva Valley. For the purposes of the competition, boats must conform to dimensions and construction requirements specified by the competition rules. The hull must be made of wood, and the oars must have a traditional design. The steering oar, known as the parić, must be at least 3.8 metres long. Each boat also carries a 3.5-metre mast with the crew's flag, sponsor's flag, and race number.

To prevent competitors from modifying boats to gain an unfair advantage, the Neretva Boatmen Association introduced a fleet of standardized boats. The association owns 33 standardized boats, which are used exclusively for the marathon. No modifications are permitted.

A crew consists of ten rowers, a drummer and a steerer (parićar). During the race, up to six rowers may be replaced at the designated changeover point in Opuzen. A crew therefore consists of between 12 and 18 competitors. The drummer can also replace a rower during the race.

Since 2005, participation has been open to competitors regardless of their place of birth or origin. Crews from the Neretva region of Bosnia and Herzegovina, including Čapljina, Čeljevo and Gabela, have participated, as have crews from the Croatian diaspora in Australia, Italy and Serbia. A crew from Riga, Latvia, competed in 2014 and 2015.

The Domagojevi gusari (Duke Domagoj pirates) crew from Vid owns the oldest surviving Neretvian lađa used in the competition, built in 1895. In 2000, the first and only ever mixed-gender crew Žabe i komari (Frogs and Crane flies) from Metković competed in a Neretvian lađa built in 1903, which achieved great success by simply reaching the finish line in Ploče, and interestingly enough, they still hold the record for the slowest marathon rowed - 4 hours and 2 minutes. After that, several female-only crews also participated in the Marathon, and since 2014, a separate competition for women has been established, which is held every year on the Thursday before the men's marathon, on a half-shorter course from Metković to Opuzen.

== Results ==
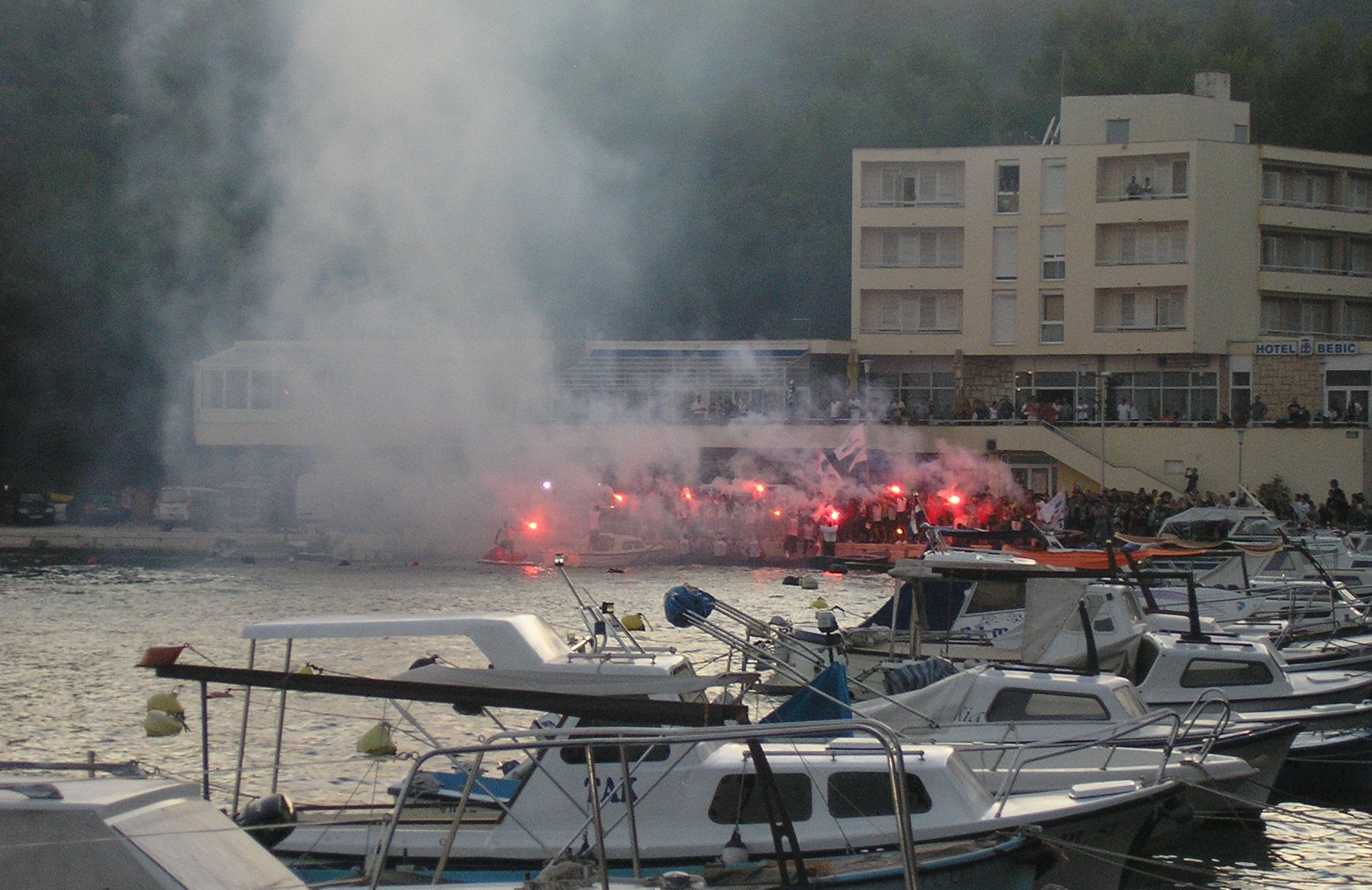
The winner enters the finish line in Ploče

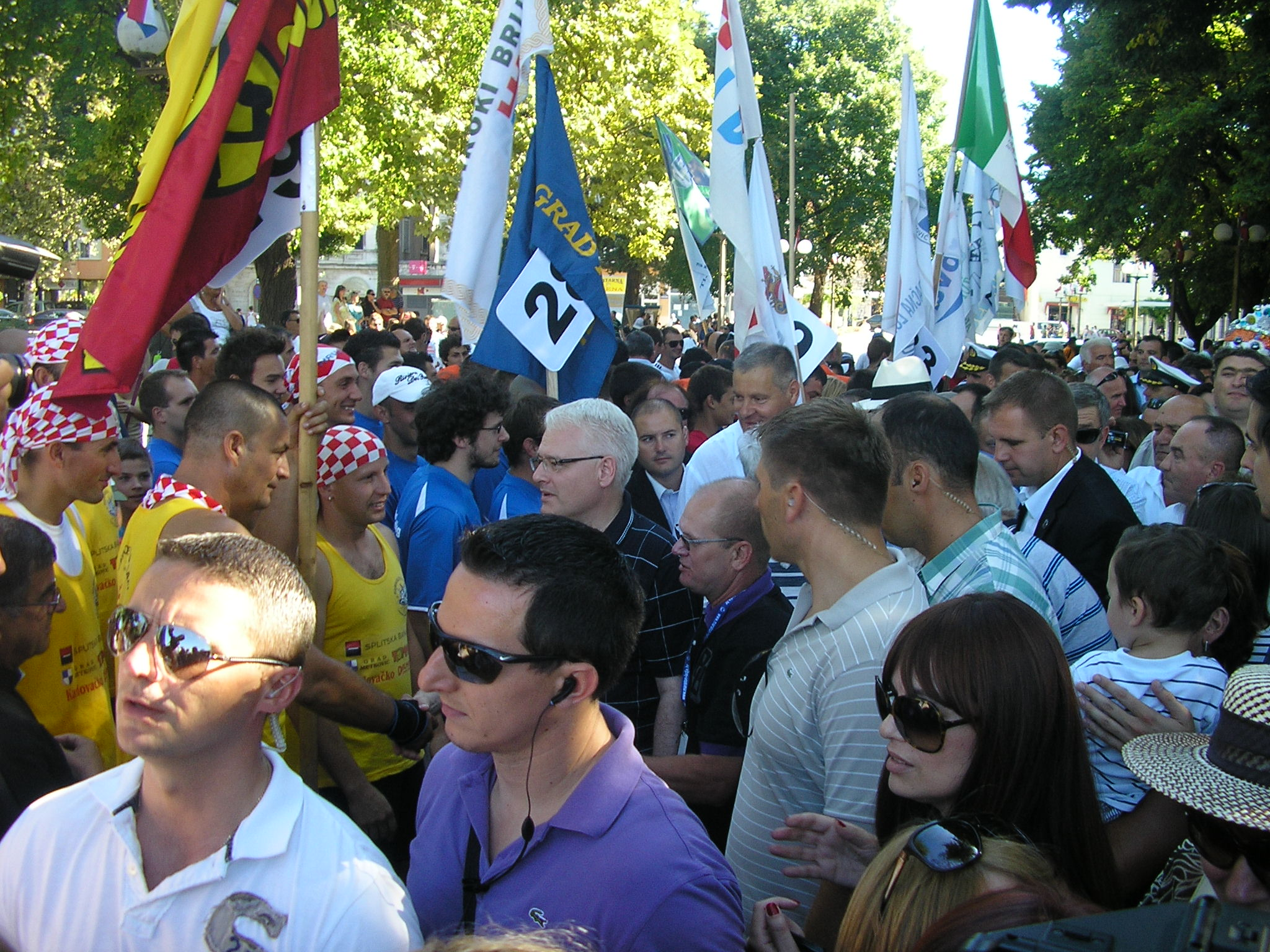
President of the Republic of Croatia Ivo Josipović with boatmen in Metković ahead of the start of the 14th Marathon

Seasone	Date	Winner's time	Gold	Silver	Bronze	Number of crews
1	13 September 1998	2h 20'	Rogotin	Gusari (Komin)	Banja Sagena	18
2	7 August 1999	— (Note: There are no official times for the 2nd Marathon.)	Rogotin	Gusari (Komin)	Ništa naglo (Komin)	25
3	13 August 2000	2h 12'	Komin	Rogotin	Gusari (Komin)	26
4	11 August 2001	2h 15'	Komin	Donjani donji (Slivno)	Rogotin	31
5	9 August 2002	2h 06'	Donjani donji (Slivno)	Komin	Čeveljuša	33
6	9 August 2003	2h 18' 07"	Komin & Rogotin (finished together)		Donjani donji (Slivno)	31
7	14 August 2004	2h 15' 51"	Donjani donji (Slivno)	Baćina	Rogotin	33
8	13 August 2005	2h 09' 02"	Rogotin	Domagojevi gusari (Vid)	Komin	40
9	12 August 2006	2h 06' 50"	Rogotin	PMF Zagreb	Domagojevi gusari (Vid)	35
10	11 August 2007	2h 09' 13"	Rogotin	Komin	Donjani donji (Slivno)	33
11	9 August 2008	— (Note: There are no official times for the 11th Marathon because the judges did not provide them.)	Staševica	Baćina	Rogotin	33
12	8 August 2009	2h 14' 48"	Gusari (Komin)	Donjani Donji (Slivno)	Marko Markota (Rogotin)	40
13	14 August 2010	2h 13' 20"	Gusari (Komin)	Stablina	Marko Markota (Rogotin) & Baćina (Note: The Marko Markota crew from Rogotin filed an official complaint due to the violation of the rules by the Baćina crew. Based on the facts and witness statements, the judges decided to award both crews third place and share bronze medals at the 13th Marathon.)	35
14	13 August 2011	2h 16' 44"	Gusari (Komin)	Baćina	Opuzen	35
15	11 August 2012	2h 21' 18"	Gusari (Komin)	Baćina	Žrnovski galijoti	37
16	10 August 2013	2h 17' 05" (Note: The appeals panel decided to disqualify the crews of Stablina (2nd place) and Baćina (6th place) for fighting during the race and at the finish line, which caused great damage to the reputation of the Boat Marathon. The panel also decided to penalize 12 crews for false starts, 2 crews for sailing outside the corridor and other minor irregularities, and one crew for improper mast length, with one minute added to their time at the 16th Marathon.)	Gusari (Komin)	Crni Put (Metković)	Žrnovski galijoti	41
17	9 August 2014	2h 09' 09"	Crni put (Metković)	Stablina & Gusari (Komin) (finished together)		37
18	8 August 2015	2h 14' 14"	Stablina	Gusari (Komin)	Crni put (Metković)	40
19	13 August 2016	2h 20' 32"	Argo (Bjelovar)	Stablina & Gusari (Komin) (finished together)		34
20	12 August 2017	2h 11' 02"	Gusari (Komin)	Argo (Bjelovar)	Crni put (Metković) & Stablina (finished together)	30
21	11 August 2018	2h 13' 40"	Stablina	Argo (Bjelovar)	Gusari (Komin)	26
22	10 August 2019	2h 11' 16"	Gusari (Komin)	Stablina	Crni put (Metković)	28
23	8 August 2020	2h 04' 32"	Zagreb & Stablina (Note: After an appeal against the referee's decision on the right of way made during the race, the refereeing organization reviewed the footage and, due to the complete equality of the crews, it was determined that the Zagreb crew was wrongly given the right of way. Due to this situation, the Stablina crew was placed in a disadvantageous position at a location where later overtaking is practically impossible, and it was decided that first place would be shared between the Zagreb and Stablina crews. The winning time is the time of the Zagreb crew.)		Sveti Ilija (Metković)	35
24	14 August 2021	2h 11' 47"	Stablina	Zagreb	Crni put (Metković)	33
25	13 August 2022	2h 08' 28"	Zagreb	Stablina	Crni put (Metković)	30
26	12 August 2023	2h 08' 21"	Zagreb	Općina Slivno	Gusari (Komin)	29
27	10 August 2024	2h 15' 09"	Zagreb	Gusari (Komin)	Općina Slivno	31
28	9 August 2025	2h 11' 28,28"	Zagreb	Gusari (Komin)	Stablina	32

Competition results are available on the Association's website.

== Medal table ==
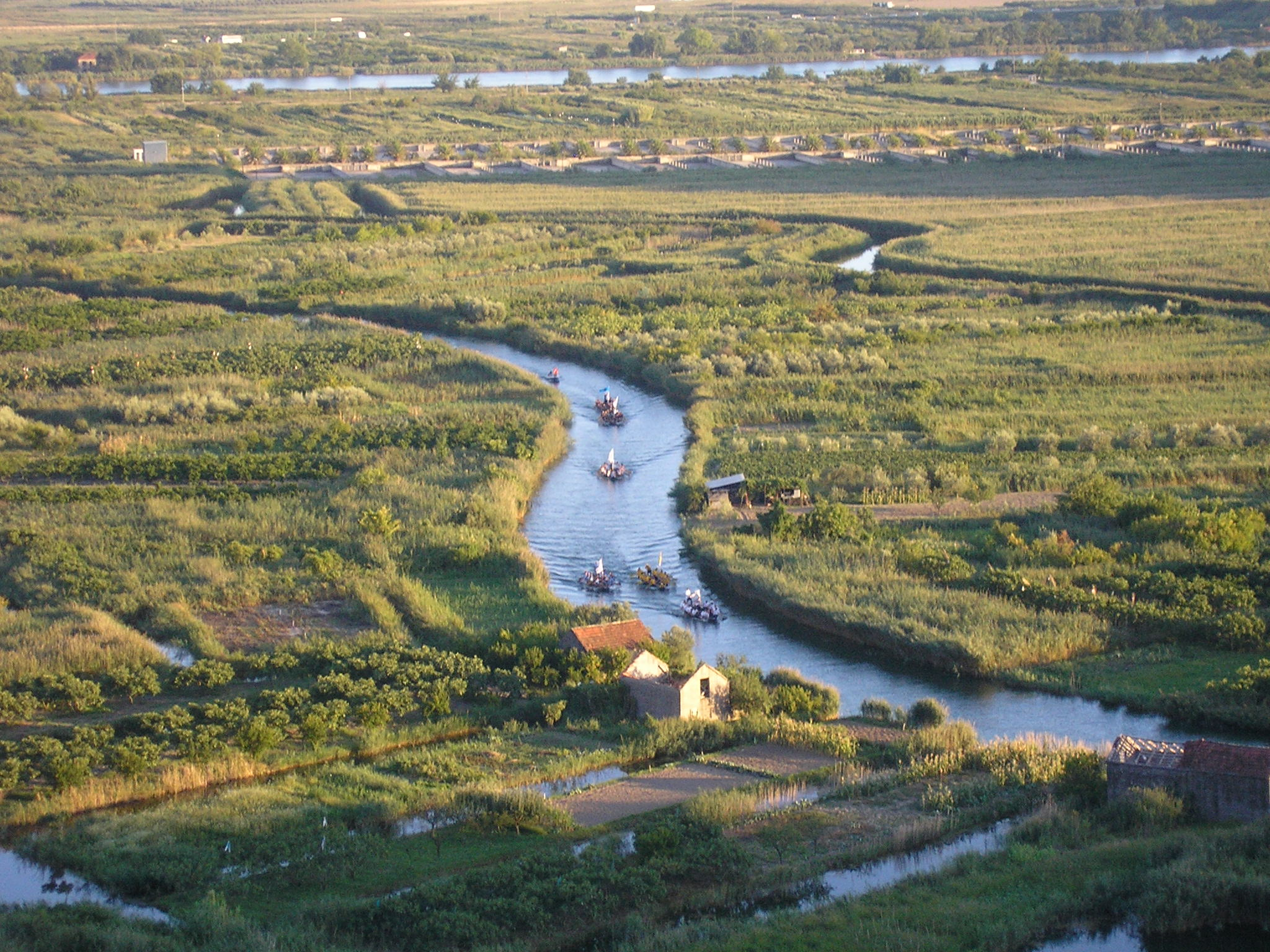
Several Neretvian lađa on the part of the route through the Crna Rika river

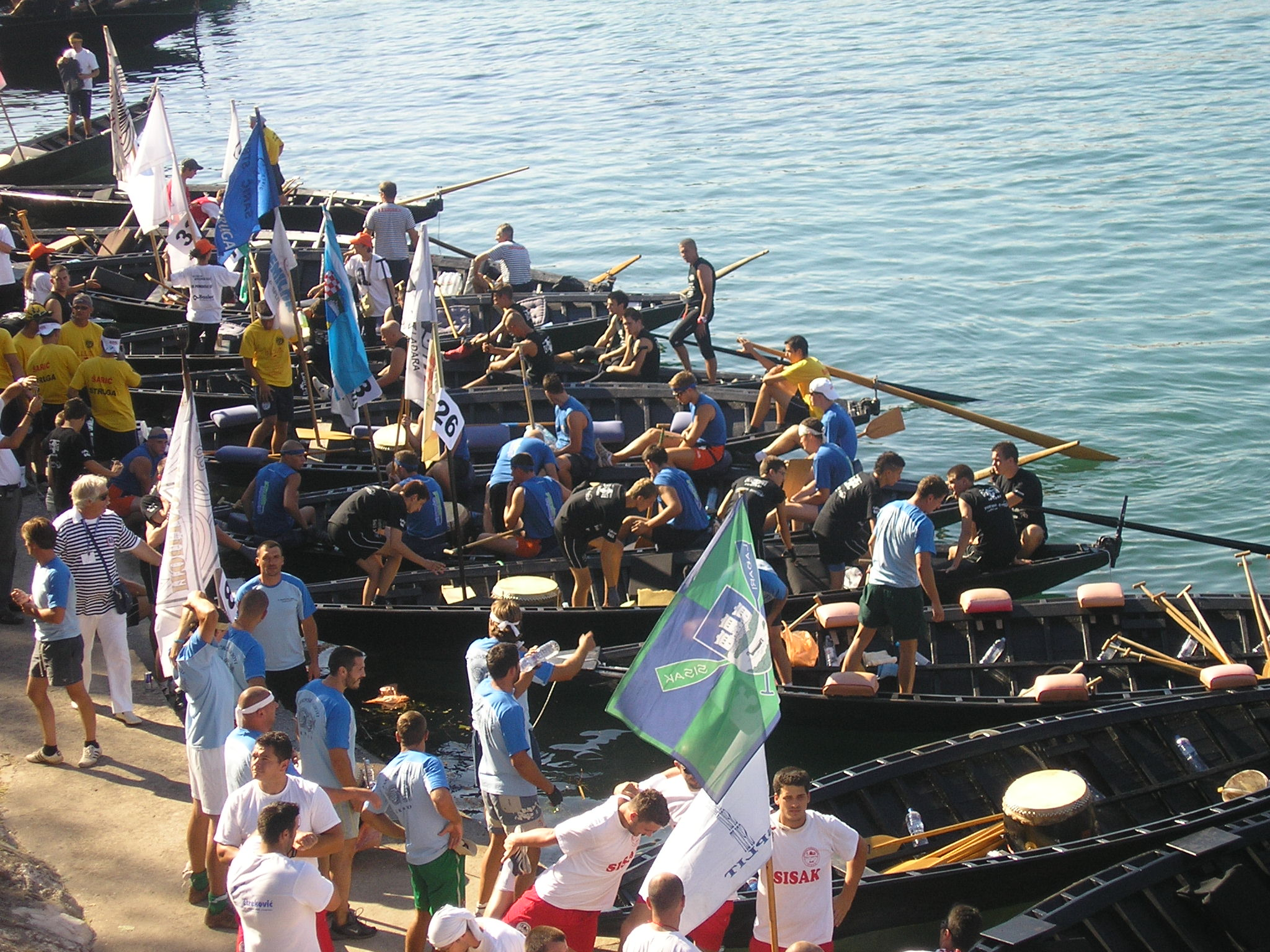
Final preparations before the start of the marathon in Metkovic

	Crew	Town	Gold	Silver	Bronze	Total
1	Gusari	Komin	7	7	3	17
2	Rogotin	Rogotin	6	1	3	10
3	Zagreb	Zagreb	5	1		6
4	Stablina	Stablina	4	5	2	11
5	Komin	Komin	3	2	1	6
6	Donjani donji	Slivno	2	2	2	6
7	Argo	Bjelovar	1	2		3
8	Crni put	Metković	1	1	5	7
9	Staševica	Staševica	1			1
10	Baćina	Baćina		4	1	5
11	Domagojevi gusari	Vid		1	1	2
11	Općina Slivno	Slivno		1	1	2
13	PMF Zagreb	Zagreb		1		1
14	Marko Markota	Rogotin			2	2
14	Žrnovski galijoti	Žrnovo			2	2
16	Banja Sagena	Banja			1	1
16	Čeveljuša	Čeveljuša			1	1
16	Ništa naglo	Komin			1	1
16	Opuzen	Opuzen			1	1
16	Sveti Ilija	Metković			1	1

Gusari of Komin are the most successful crew in the history of the competition, with seven victories. They won five consecutive editions between 2009 and 2013 and have also finished second seven times and third three times. The crew has won the Domagoj Shield permanently.

Rogotin is the second-most successful crew, with six victories. The crew has also recorded one second-place and three third-place finishes.

Zagreb won three consecutive editions from 2022 to 2024, earning permanent possession of the Domagoj Shield. Its five victories rank it third in the overall number of wins.

Argo Bjelovar became the first winning crew from outside the Neretva Valley when they won the 2016 edition. Its unexpected victory was later the subject of the documentary film "Golden Fleece, Argonauts of the Pond" (Zlatno runo, Argonauti s ribnjaka).

== Women's competition ==
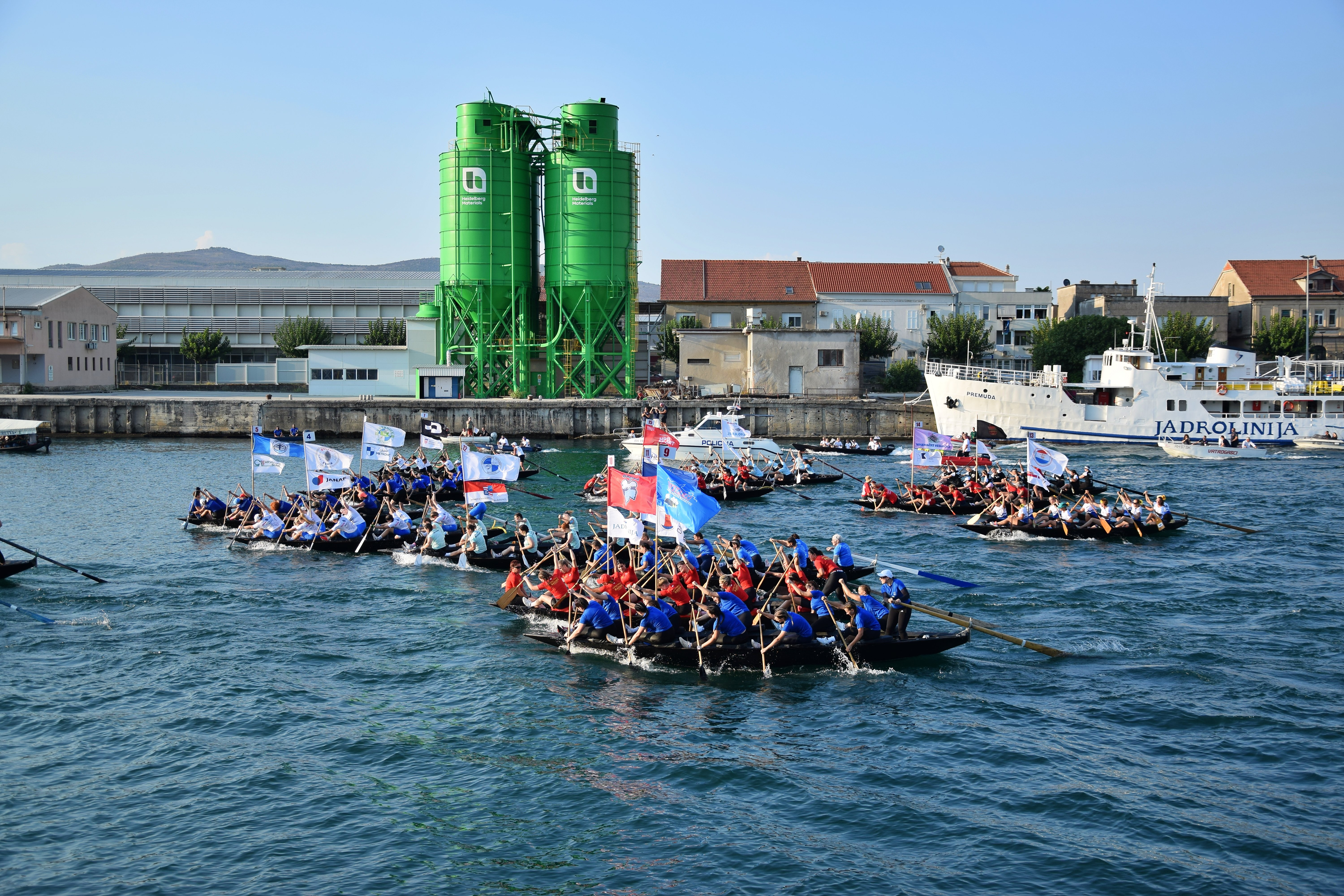
Start of Women’s Lađa Marathon 2026

A separate women's race, the Maraton lađarica, was introduced on 7 August 2014 as part of the 17th Maraton lađa. The women's race covers approximately 10 kilometres.

From 2014 through 2017, the women's race was rowed upstream from Opuzen to Metković, reflecting the historical practice of women in the Neretva Valley pulling boats upstream with ropes. Because of the physical demands and increased risk of injury, the direction was reversed in 2018. Since then, the women's race has started beneath the Lučki Bridge in Metković and finished near the Old Bridge in Opuzen.

The women's competition is also international in character. The Sisak crew became the dominant team in the event in the early 2020s, winning five consecutive editions from 2022 through 2026.

Including the 2026 race, the Sisak crew has the most medals. After one silver and one bronze, they currently have an unbroken streak of 5 wins in a row.

== International and other rowing activities ==
The Lađa Marathon has contributed to the international promotion of Neretvian lađa rowing.

In July 2008, a Neretva crew participated in the Festival of the Sea and Sailors in Brest, France. On 26 June 2009, a representative Neretva crew crossed the English Channel between the British and French coasts in 3 hours and 40 minutes.

On 19 June 2010, a Neretva crew rowed across the Adriatic Sea from Metković to Termoli, Italy, a distance of approximately 140 nautical miles, rowing continuously for approximately 35 hours.

In June 2013, a Neretva crew became the first international crew to participate in the Palio del Mediterraneo, a traditional-boat race held in Taranto, Italy.

In May 2025, to promote the Neretvian lađa Marathon and its heritage and to mark the 33rd anniversary of the Republic of Croatia's entry into the UN, a mixed crew from Neretva and Bjelovar rowed around Manhattan and the Statue of Liberty on a 51-kilometer route.

== Legacy and influence ==
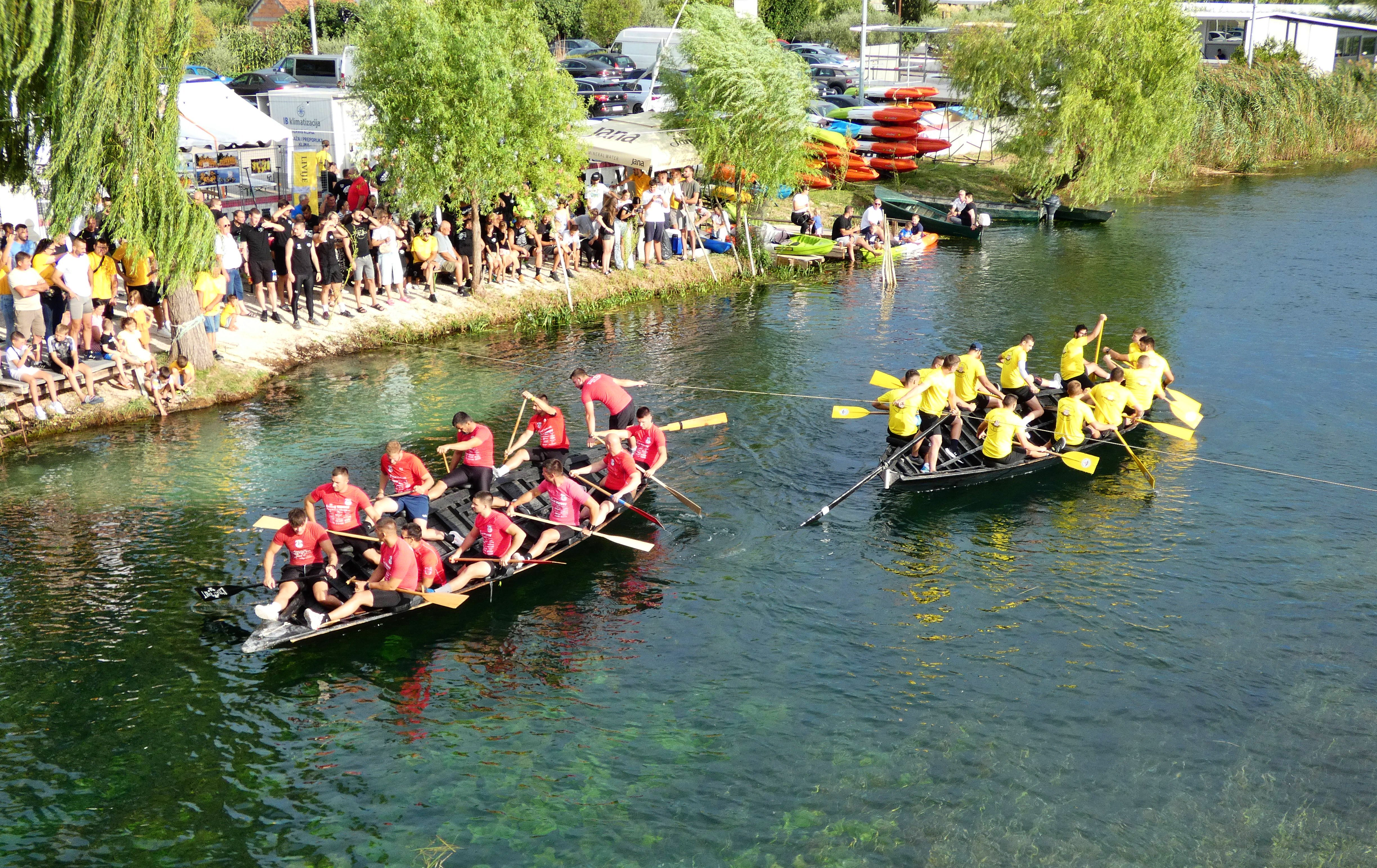
Duke Domagoj Cup in Vid on July 26, 2026

The success of the Maraton lađa contributed to the preservation and revitalization of the traditional Neretvian lađa and inspired the establishment of other traditional-boat competitions in Croatia.

Among the events associated with the Neretva rowing tradition are the St. Elijah Cup in Metković, the Župa Bagalović Rowing Cup, the Duke Domagoj Cup in Vid, the Small Trupa Race and the international Neretva Boat Regatta.

The popularity of the Lađa Marathon also encouraged the organization and revival of traditional rowing competitions involving other types of historic boats along the Croatian coast, including the Lošinj Pasara Rowing Regatta and women's rowing regattas in Betina and Krapanj.

Croatian Post issued a €1.80 commemorative stamp on 8 July 2024 depicting Neretva boatmen during the Lađa Marathon, together with a first-day cover.

The Croatian National Bank issued gold and silver numismatic coins entitled Neretvanska lađa in 2026 as part of its “Old Croatian Ships” series; their designs depict the lađa and two crews rowing, respectively, the latter evoking scenes from the Lađa Marathon.
