= Neretva lađa =

Traditional wooden riverboat of Croatia's Neretva delta

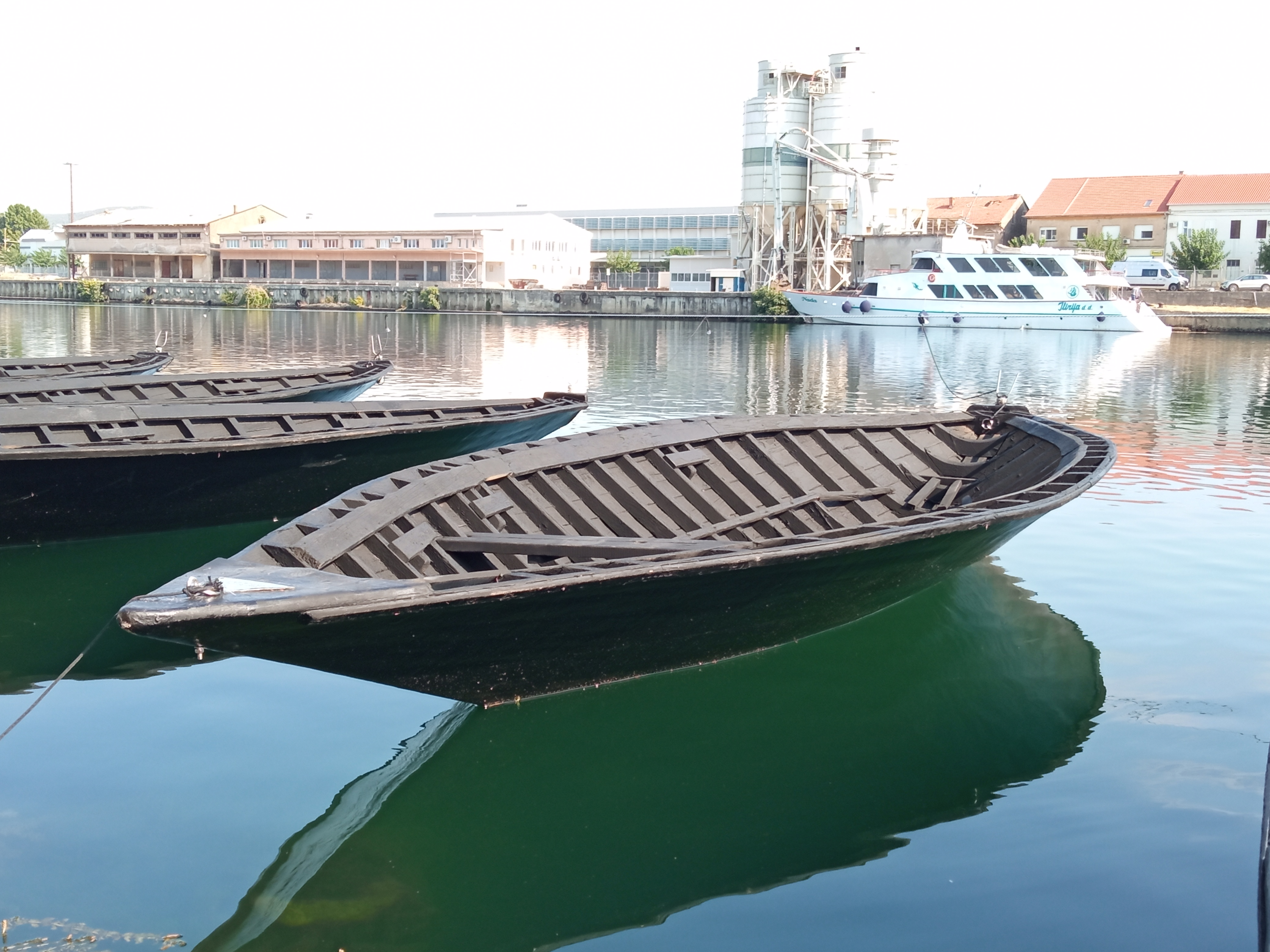
Neretva lađa at Metković

A Neretva lađa (Croatian: Neretvanska lađa, lit. 'Neretva boat'), or simply lađa, is a traditional open wooden riverboat of the Neretva delta in southern Croatia. It was historically used to transport people, agricultural produce, livestock, and other cargo through the delta's shallow waters, channels, and wetlands.

== Description ==
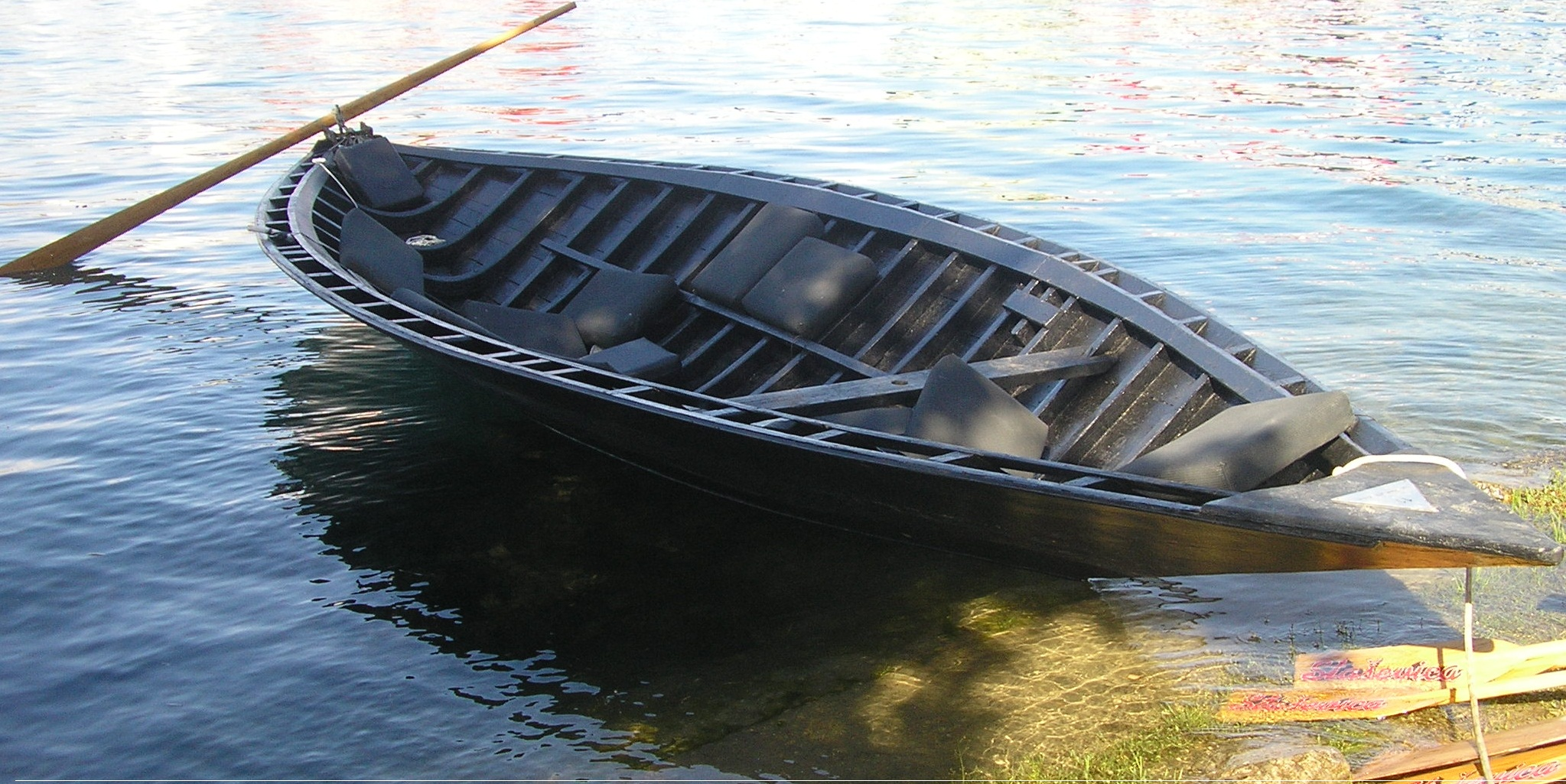
Neretva lađa

A lađa is generally about 8 metres (26 ft) long and 2–3 metres (6.6–9.8 ft) wide, with a carrying capacity of up to 3.5 tonnes. It has a shallow draft and raised bow and stern. Traditionally, it is propelled by four or more oars; it may also be fitted with an outboard motor or, less commonly, a sail.

== History and present use ==
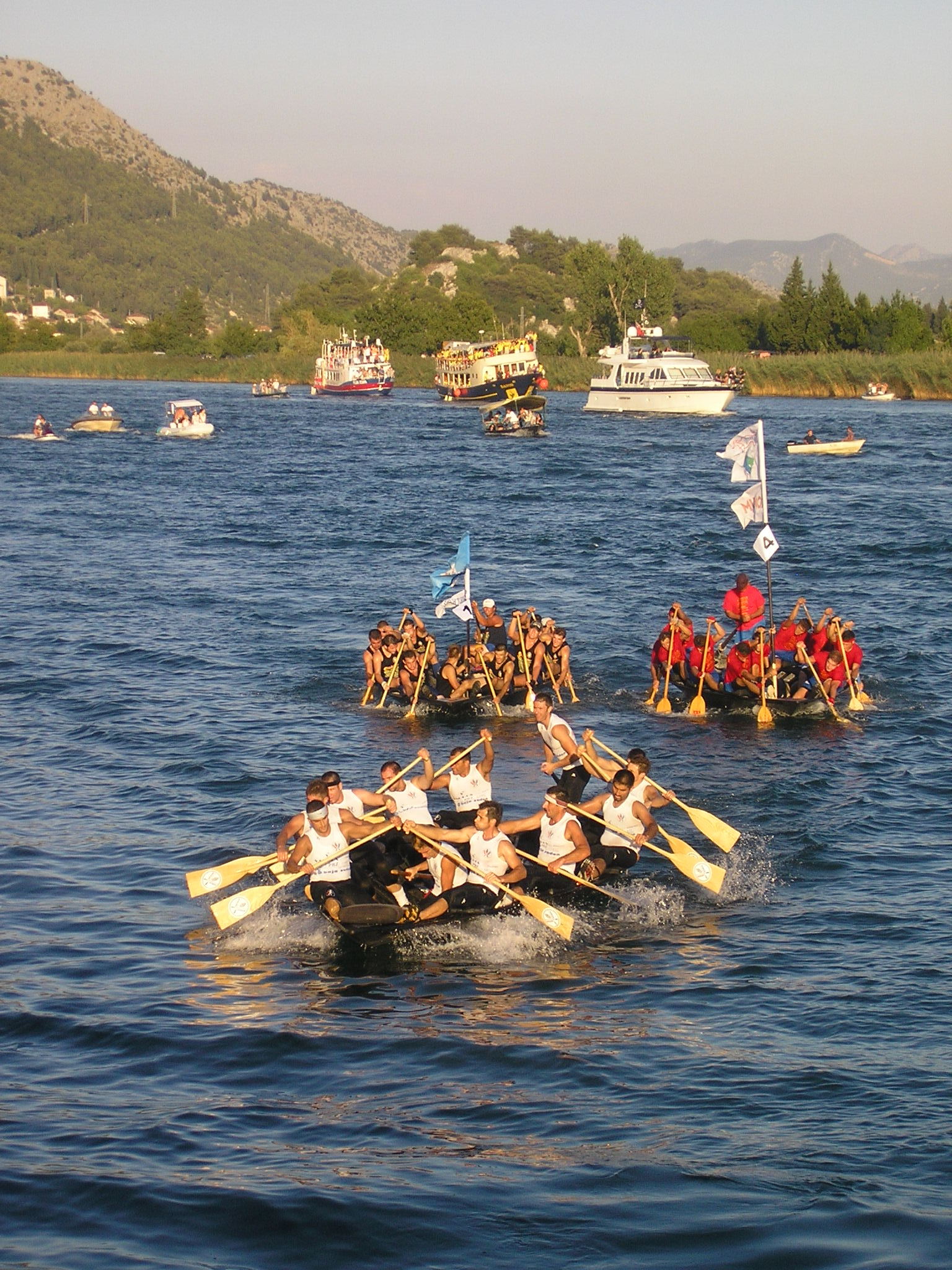
Lađa Marathon on Neretva river

For centuries, lađa were the principal means of transporting cargo in the Neretva valley. Smaller vessels known as trupa or trupica were more commonly used for individual transport, fishing, and small loads. Their practical role declined with the development of roads and motor transport during the 20th century, but the boat remains an important element of the region's cultural heritage.

The Croatian Maritime Museum in Split holds a Neretva lađa built in Komin in 1934, which the museum describes as probably the oldest originally preserved example.

=== Lancanje ===
Historically, a lađa could also be moved upstream by lancanje (towpath hauling), in which the vessel was pulled from the bank with a long rope. The task was performed predominantly by women, known as lancarice, while a man aboard the boat steered it.

The City of Metković has an annual civic award named "Lancarice", commemorating this local tradition. The award is granted in the field of business.

=== Lađa Marathon ===
Lađa are since 1998 also used in the annual Lađa Marathon on Neretva river, a rowing race held on a 22.5-kilometre (14.0 mi) course from Metković to Ploče. The race uses crews of ten rowers, a drummer, and a helmsman.

== See also ==
- Neretva
- Lađa Marathon
