= Prud =

Prud may refer to:

- Prud, Bosnia and Herzegovina, a village near Odžak, northern Bosnia
- Prud, Croatia, a village near Metković, southern Croatia
