= Ivan Slamnig =

Croatian writer (1930–2001)

Ivan Slamnig (24 June 1930 – 3 July 2001) was a Croatian poet, novelist, literary theorist and translator.

Slamnig was born in Metković. He graduated from the University of Zagreb Faculty of Humanities and Social Sciences in 1955 and later taught at its Department of Comparative Literature. His poem Barbara, set to music by Zvonko Špišić, was a hit in 1975.

Slamnig was a full member of the Croatian Academy of Sciences and Arts from 1992.

== Works ==
=== Poetry ===
- Aleja poslije svečanosti (1956.)
- Odron (1956.)
- Naronska siesta (1963.)
- Limb (1968.)
- Analecta (1971.)
- Dronta (1981.)
- Sed scholae (1987.)
- Reativno naopako (1987.)
- Tajna (1988.)
- Ranjeni tenk (2000.)

=== Prose ===
- Neprijatelj (1959.), short stories
- Povratnik s mjeseca (1964.), short stories
- Bolja polovica hrabrosti (1972.), novel
- Firentinski capriccio (1987.), radio dramas

== Sources ==
- Ivan Slamnig (in Croatian)
- Preminuli članovi (in Croatian)
- Utjeha kaosa (in Croatian)
- Melankolično evanđelje po Ivanu (in Croatian)
- Helena Peričić, 'Strana književnost i nacionalna književna tradicija (O dvjema Slamnigovim raspravama u časopisu Međutim)', Književna revija (Dani Ivana Slamniga, Osijek, 26.-29. listopada 2000.), ur. Branka Ban et al., Osijek, Matica hrvatska - Osijek, 1–2, 2001., 65–67.
- Helena Peričić, 'Stvarno/nestvarno u radio-dramama Ivana Slamniga', OS lamnigu - drugi, zbornik izabranih radova triju saziva međunarodnoga znanstvenog skkupa Modernitet druge polovice dvadesetoga stoljeća, Ivan Slamnig - Boro Pavlović, postmodernitet, Dani Ivana Slamniga (Osijek, studenog 2002., Osijek - Budimpešta, prosinca 2003.-siječnja 2004, Poznan, listopada 2005.), 2006., Osijek/Poznan, Filozofski fakultet Osijek, Uniwersytet im Adama Mickiewicza w Poznaniu, 2006., 227–234.
- Helena Peričić, 'Između stvaralačkog egzila i poticaja domaće književne tradicije (Slamnig, Šoljan, Paljetak)', in: Dani hvarskog kazališta (Prostor i granice hrvatske književnosti i kazališta), ed. by N. Batušić et al., Zagreb-Split, HAZU-Književni krug, 32, 2006, 346–359.
- Helena Peričić, 'Multiculturalism and the Return to Tradition. Elements of the Literatures in English in the Works of Some Postmodern Croatian Playwrights: Slamnig - Šoljan - Paljetak', Identities in Transition in the English-Speaking World, ed. by Nicoletta Vasta et al., Udine, Forum, 2011, 251–260.
