= Peračko Blato =

- Village
- Location within Croatia
- Coordinates: 43°4′37″N 17°26′24″E
- Country: Croatia
- County: Dubrovnik-Neretva County
- Municipality: Ploče

Area
  - Total: 2.2 sq mi (5.7 km^{2})

Population (2021)
  - Total: 280
  - Density: 130/sq mi (49/km^{2})
- Time zone: UTC+1 (CET)
  - Summer (DST): UTC+2 (CEST)

Peračko Blato is a village in Dubrovnik-Neretva County in Croatia.

== Demographics ==
According to the 2021 census, its population was 280. It was 288 in 2011.
