= Pržinovac =

- Village
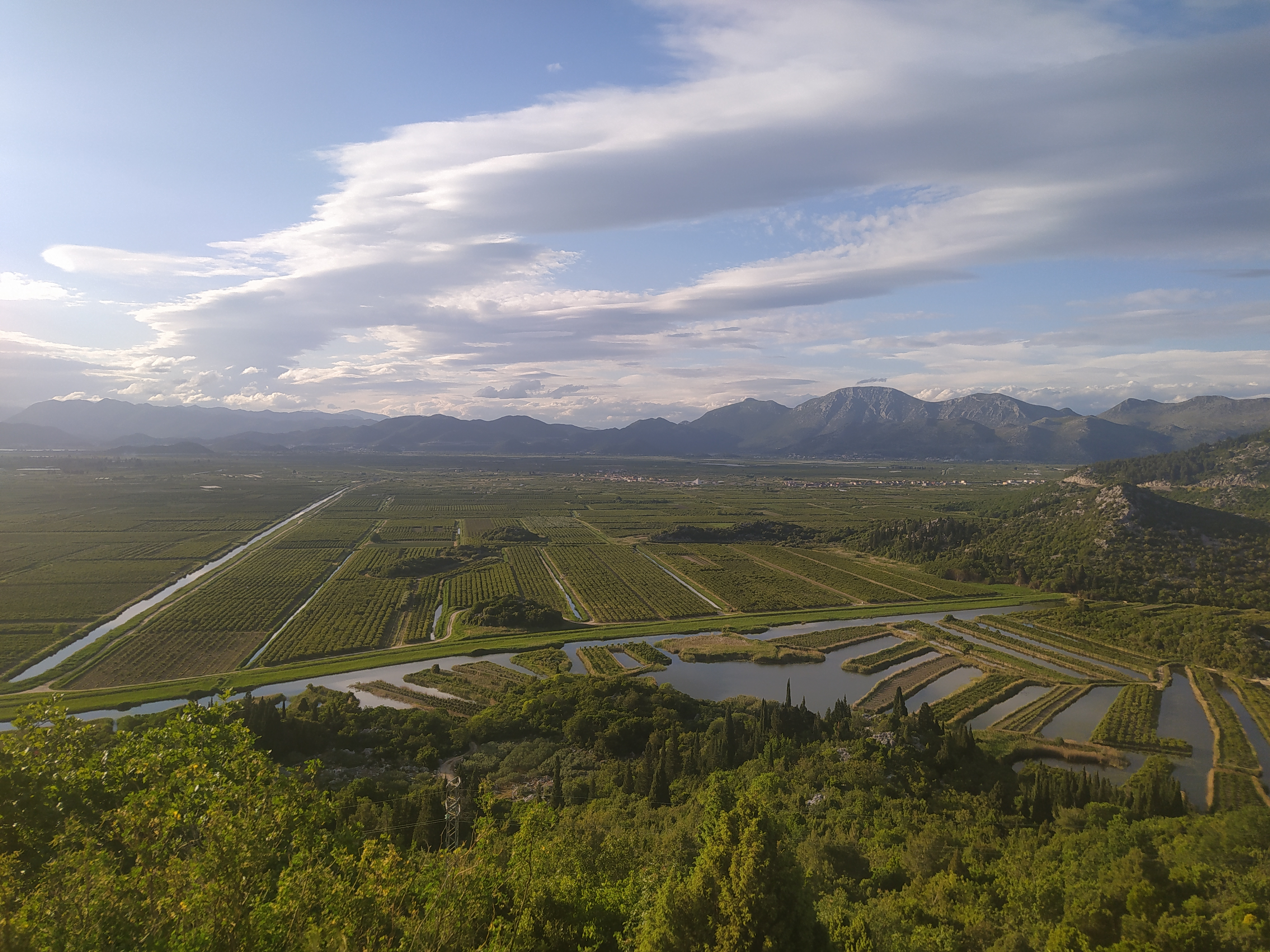

- Location within Croatia
- Coordinates: 43°1′2″N 17°33′52″E
- Country: Croatia
- County: Dubrovnik-Neretva County
- Municipality: Opuzen

Area
  - Total: 0.93 sq mi (2.4 km^{2})

Population (2021)
  - Total: 13
  - Density: 14/sq mi (5.4/km^{2})
- Time zone: UTC+1 (CET)
  - Summer (DST): UTC+2 (CEST)

Pržinovac is a village in Dubrovnik-Neretva County in Croatia.

== Demographics ==
According to the 2021 census, its population was only 13. It was 33 in 2011.
