= Buk Vlaka =

- Village
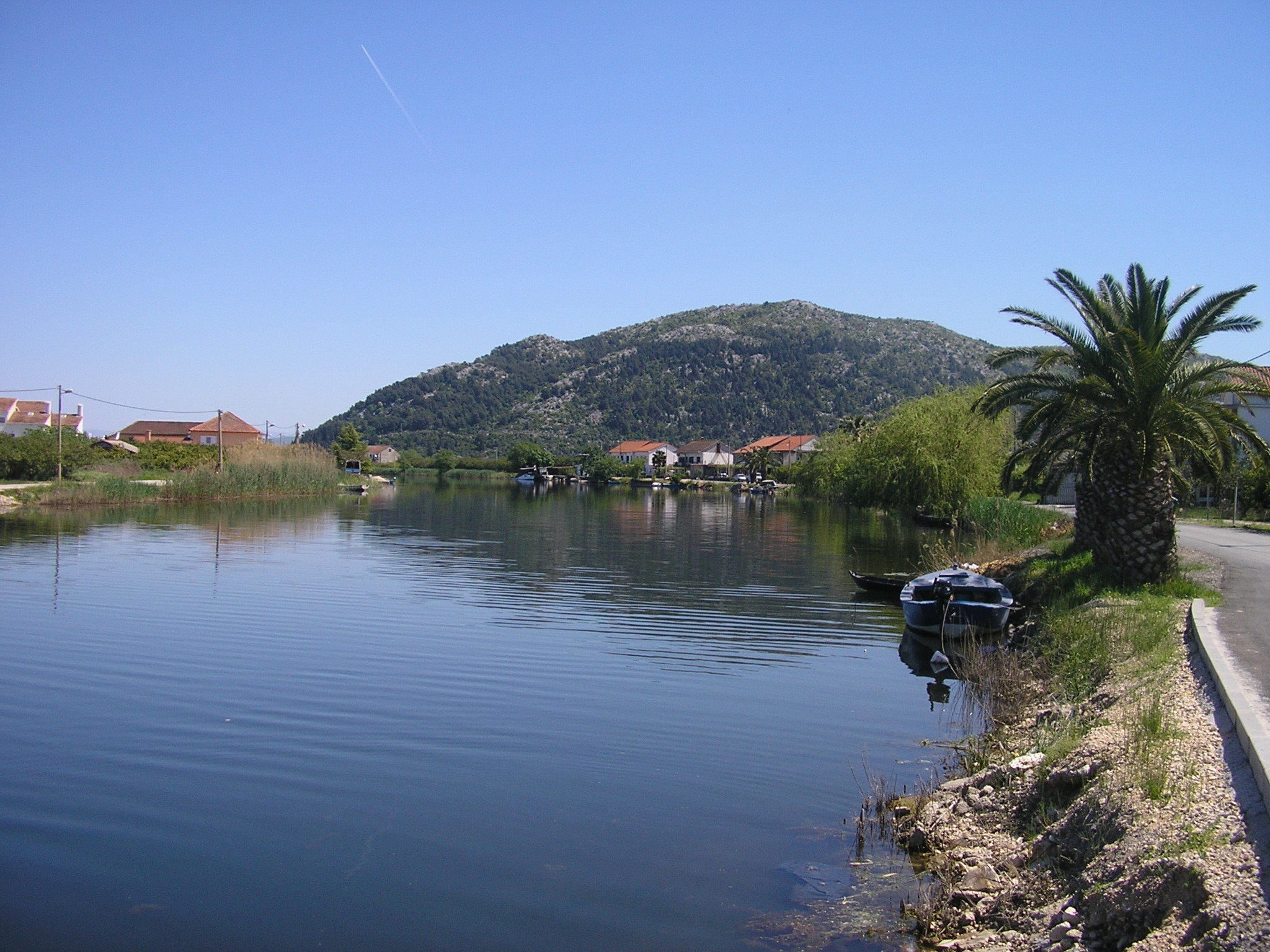

- Location within Croatia
- Coordinates: 43°0′34″N 17°31′32″E
- Country: Croatia
- County: Dubrovnik-Neretva County
- Municipality: Opuzen

Area
  - Total: 3.5 sq mi (9.0 km^{2})

Population (2021)
  - Total: 470
  - Density: 140/sq mi (52/km^{2})
- Time zone: UTC+1 (CET)
  - Summer (DST): UTC+2 (CEST)

Buk Vlaka is a village in Dubrovnik-Neretva County in Croatia.

== Demographics ==
According to the 2021 census, its population was 470. It was 492 in 2011.
