= Glušci, Croatia =

Glušci
- Village
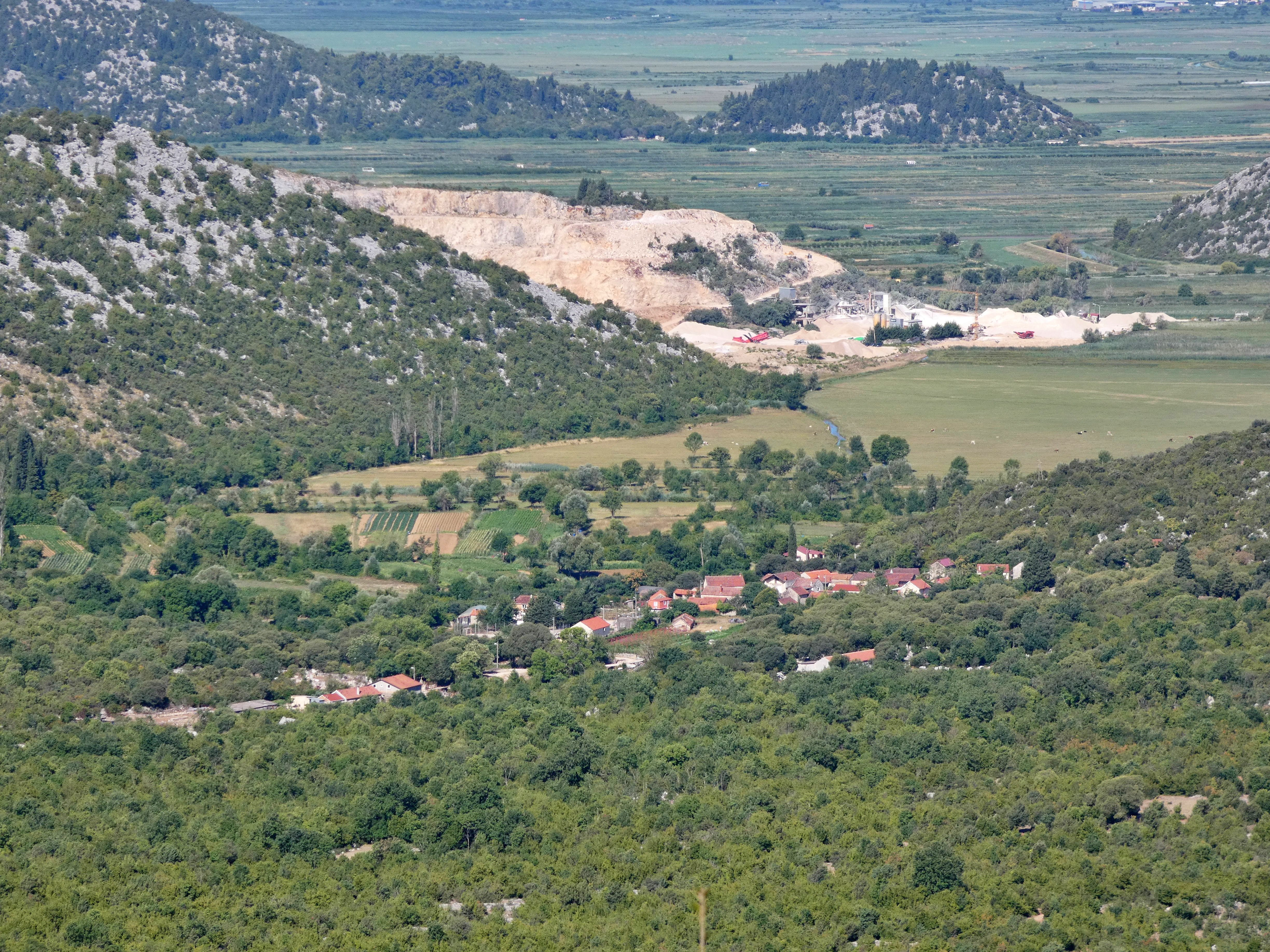

- Location within Croatia
- Coordinates: 43°01′01″N 17°40′41″E
- Country: Croatia
- County: Dubrovnik-Neretva County
- Municipality: Metković

Area
  - Total: 1.2 sq mi (3.1 km^{2})

Population (2021)
  - Total: 53
  - Density: 44/sq mi (17/km^{2})
- Time zone: UTC+1 (CET)
  - Summer (DST): UTC+2 (CEST)
- Postal code: 20350 Metković

Glušci is a village in the town of Metković, Croatia.

== Demographics ==
According to the 2021 census, its population was 53. According to the 2011 census, the village had 76 inhabitants.

=== Demographics history ===
Population by census
1857	1869	1880	1890	1900	1910	1921	1931	1948	1953	1961	1971	1981	1991	2001	2011	2021
0	0	93	89	99	126	0	0	138	146	153	130	106	97	65	76	53
