= Baćina =

Baćina may refer to:

- Baćina, Croatia
- Baćina, Bosnia and Herzegovina
