= Dubravica, Metković =

Dubravica
- Village

- Location within Croatia
- Coordinates: 43.0265442°N 17.6446168°E
- Country: Croatia
- County: Dubrovnik-Neretva County
- Municipality: Metković

Area
  - Total: 1.0 sq mi (2.6 km^{2})

Population (2021)
  - Total: 73
  - Density: 73/sq mi (28/km^{2})
- Time zone: UTC+1 (CET)
  - Summer (DST): UTC+2 (CEST)

Dubravica is a village in Croatia.

== Demographics ==
According to the 2021 census, its population was 73.
