= Opuzen =

- Municipality
- Grad Opuzen; Town of Opuzen
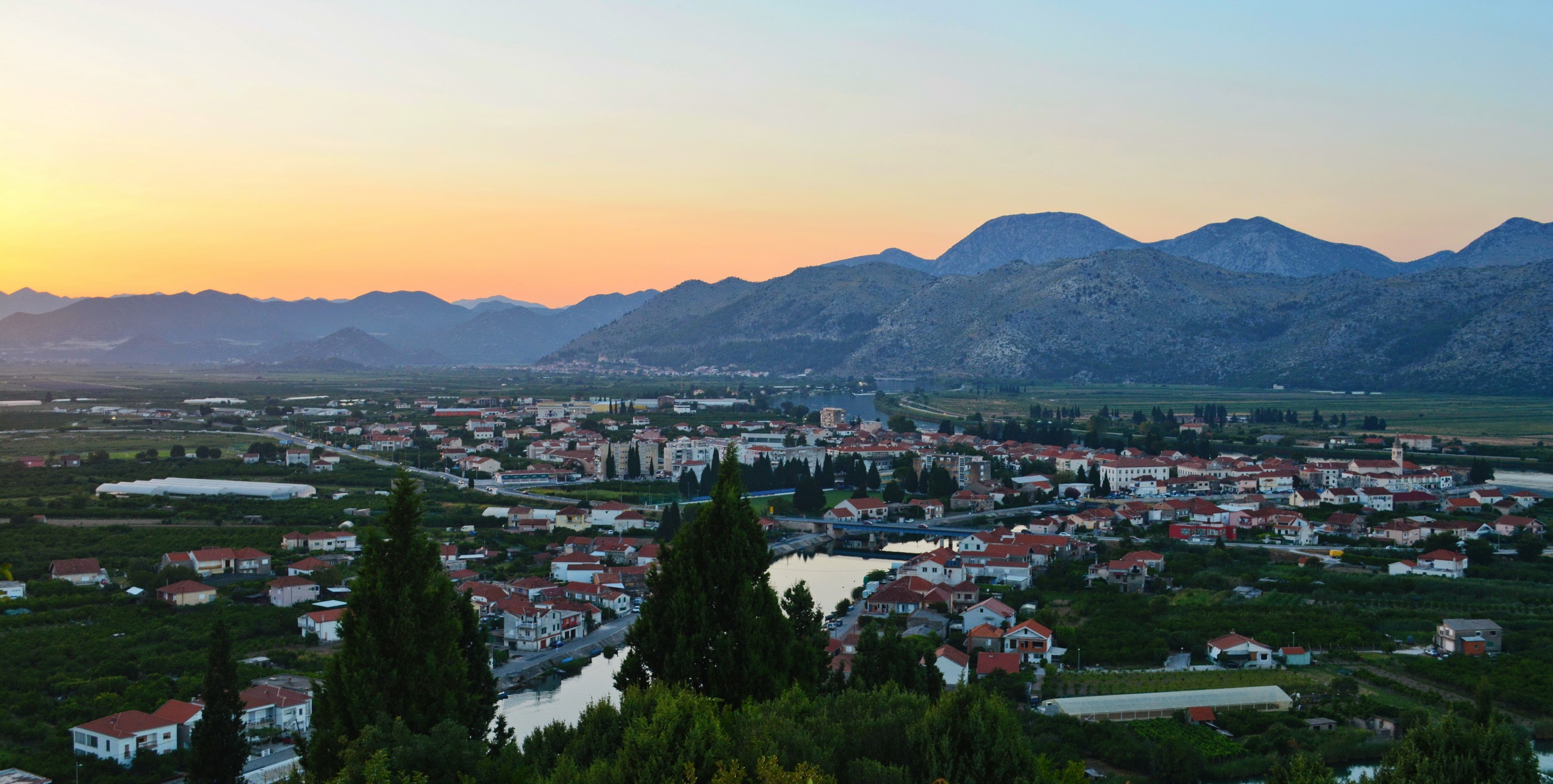
- View of Opuzen

- Location within Croatia
- Coordinates: 43.017577°N 17.562321°E
- Country: Croatia
- Region: Dalmatia (Neretva Delta)
- County: Dubrovnik-Neretva County

Government
  - Mayor: Ivan Mataga (Nezavisna lista)

Area
  - Municipality: 9.5 sq mi (24.6 km^{2})
  - Urban: 5.1 sq mi (13.3 km^{2})

Population (2021)
  - Municipality: 2,838
  - Density: 299/sq mi (115/km^{2})
  - Urban: 2,355
  - Urban density: 459/sq mi (177/km^{2})
- Time zone: UTC+1 (CET)
  - Summer (DST): UTC+2 (CEST)
- Website: opuzen.hr

Opuzen (Italian: Forte Opuseo) is a small town in Dubrovnik-Neretva County in Croatia. The town is located 12 kilometres (7.5 mi) upstream from the mouth of the river Neretva, in southern Dalmatia. This settlement is known as a major center of tangerine production in Croatia.

Opuzen got its name from its fortress, Fort Opus. The fortress was built by the Republic of Venice in 1684. Ruins of the fortress that remain are called Recycle and are part of the old town wall. The center of the old part of Opuzen is a classic Roman Forum. In the Middle Ages, Opuzen was known as Posrednica. The Republic of Ragusa in the 14th century had major trading markets (mainly trading in salt) in Opuzen. The markets got burnt down in 1472. The first Community School was opened in 1798 and was the only school in the Neretva region until 1845.

In the town is located Opuzen's Parish church of St. Stephen and it is in the main square

== Climate ==
Since records began in 1981, the highest temperature recorded at the local weather station was 40.0 °C (104.0 °F), on 23 August 2000. The coldest temperature was −9.5 °C (14.9 °F), on 12 January 1985.

== Demographics ==
According to the 2021 census, its population was 2,838 with 2,355 living in the town proper.

The total population of Opuzen was 3,254 (census 2011), in the following settlements:

- Buk Vlaka, population 492
- Opuzen, population 2,729
- Pržinovac, population 33
Town of Opuzen: Population trends 1857–2021
v

population	512	547	630	816	928	1004	928	963	1165	1317	1538	2235	2765	3458	3242	3254	2838
	1857	1869	1880	1890	1900	1910	1921	1931	1948	1953	1961	1971	1981	1991	2001	2011	2021

Sources: Croatian Bureau of Statistics publications

The partisan war soldier, Stjepan Filipović, was born in Opuzen in 1916. The local school was named after him between 1967 and 1992.

== Sports ==
Important cultural and sports events related to Opuzen and the local countryside are "The Melodies of the Croatian South" and Neretvian Lađa Marathon. The marathon is held on the river Neretva and about 35 boats participate each year.

Opuzen has several sports clubs:

- Football club NK Neretvanac - founded in 1932
- Handball club RK Opuzen - founded in 1977
- Women's handball club ZRK Neretvanka Opuzen - founded in 1989
