= Plina Jezero =

- Village
- Location within Croatia
- Coordinates: 43°6′4″N 17°28′30″E
- Country: Croatia
- County: Dubrovnik-Neretva County
- Municipality: Ploče

Area
  - Total: 9.5 sq mi (24.5 km^{2})

Population (2021)
  - Total: 32
  - Density: 3.4/sq mi (1.3/km^{2})
- Time zone: UTC+1 (CET)
  - Summer (DST): UTC+2 (CEST)

Plina Jezero is a village in Dubrovnik-Neretva County in Croatia.

== Demographics ==
According to the 2021 census, its population was 32. It was 44 in 2011.
