= Šarić Struga =

- Village
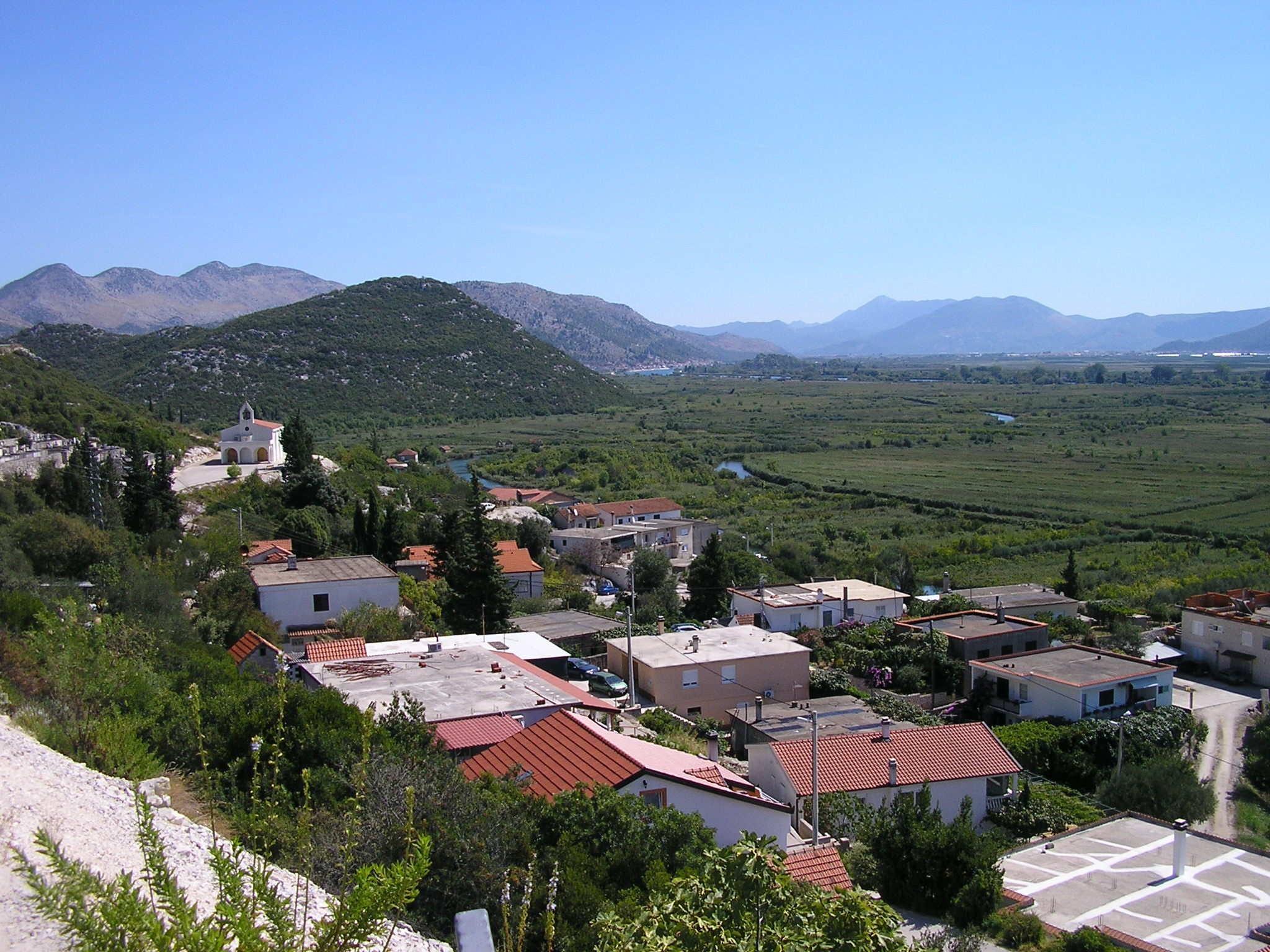

- Location within Croatia
- Coordinates: 43°3′4″N 17°29′13″E
- Country: Croatia
- County: Dubrovnik-Neretva County
- Municipality: Ploče

Area
  - Total: 1.5 sq mi (3.9 km^{2})

Population (2021)
  - Total: 194
  - Density: 130/sq mi (50/km^{2})
- Time zone: UTC+1 (CET)
  - Summer (DST): UTC+2 (CEST)

Šarić Struga is a village in Dubrovnik-Neretva County in Croatia.

== Demographics ==
According to the 2021 census, its population was 194. It was 235 in 2011.
