= Staševica =

- Village
- Location within Croatia
- Coordinates: 43°8′22″N 17°25′38″E
- Country: Croatia
- County: Dubrovnik-Neretva County
- Municipality: Ploče

Area
  - Total: 10.6 sq mi (27.5 km^{2})

Population (2021)
  - Total: 822
  - Density: 77.4/sq mi (29.9/km^{2})
- Time zone: UTC+1 (CET)
  - Summer (DST): UTC+2 (CEST)

Staševica is a village in Dubrovnik-Neretva County in Croatia.

== Demographics ==
According to the 2021 census, its population was 822. It was 902 in 2011.
