= Prud, Croatia =

Prud
- Village
- Location within Croatia
- Coordinates: 43.0920988°N 17.598753°E
- Country: Croatia
- County: Dubrovnik-Neretva County
- Municipality: Metković

Area
  - Total: 2.3 sq mi (6.0 km^{2})

Population (2021)
  - Total: 448
  - Density: 190/sq mi (75/km^{2})
- Time zone: UTC+1 (CET)
  - Summer (DST): UTC+2 (CEST)

Prud is a village in Croatia, located at the border with Bosnia and Herzegovina.

== Demographics ==
According to the 2021 census, its population was 448.
