= Baćina, Croatia =

Baćina
- Village
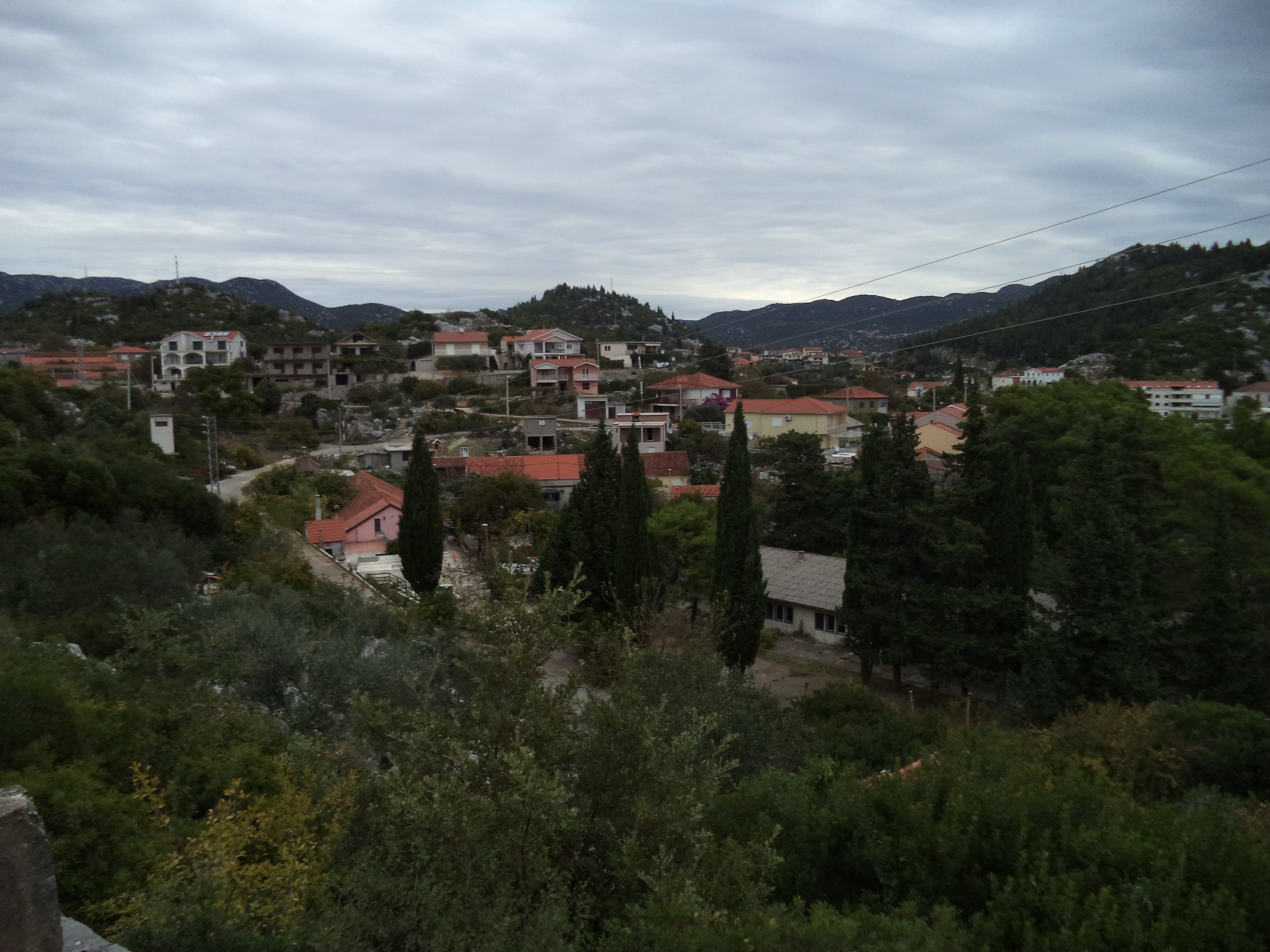

- Location within Croatia
- Coordinates: 43°4′48″N 17°23′27″E
- Country: Croatia
- County: Dubrovnik-Neretva County
- Municipality: Ploče

Area
  - Total: 10.8 sq mi (27.9 km^{2})

Population (2021)
  - Total: 513
  - Density: 47.6/sq mi (18.4/km^{2})
- Time zone: UTC+1 (CET)
  - Summer (DST): UTC+2 (CEST)

Baćina is a village in the Ploče municipality, Dubrovnik-Neretva County in Croatia.

== Demographics ==
According to the 2021 census, its population was 513. It was 578 in 2011.
