= Banja, Dubrovnik-Neretva County =

Banja
- Village
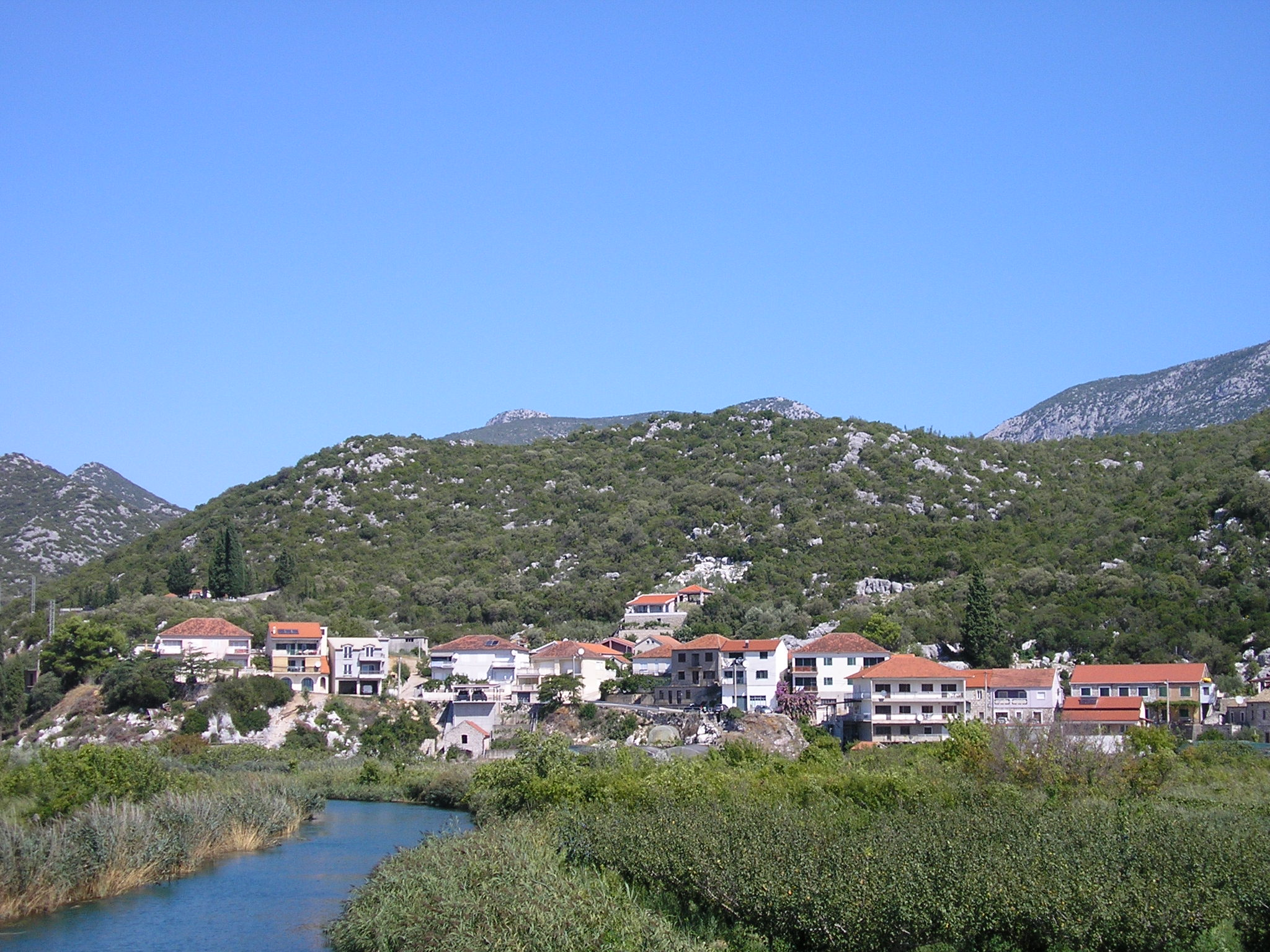

- Location within Croatia
- Coordinates: 43°2′53″N 17°30′22″E
- Country: Croatia
- County: Dubrovnik-Neretva County
- Municipality: Ploče

Area
  - Total: 1.9 sq mi (4.9 km^{2})

Population (2021)
  - Total: 153
  - Density: 81/sq mi (31/km^{2})
- Time zone: UTC+1 (CET)
  - Summer (DST): UTC+2 (CEST)

Banja is a village in Dubrovnik-Neretva County in Croatia.

== Demographics ==
According to the 2021 census, its population was 153. It was 173 in 2011.
