= Metković =

- Town
- Grad Metković; Town of Metković
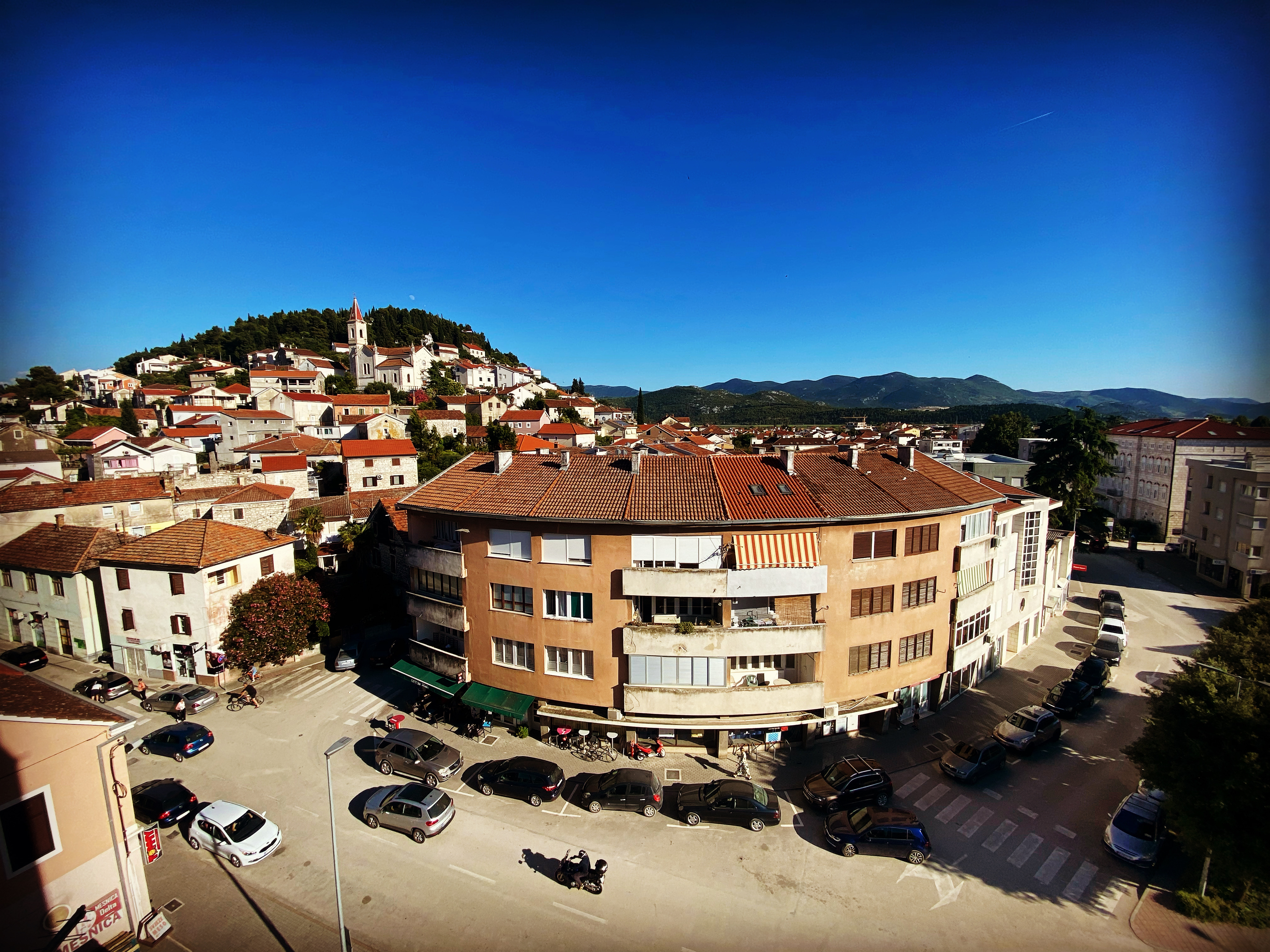
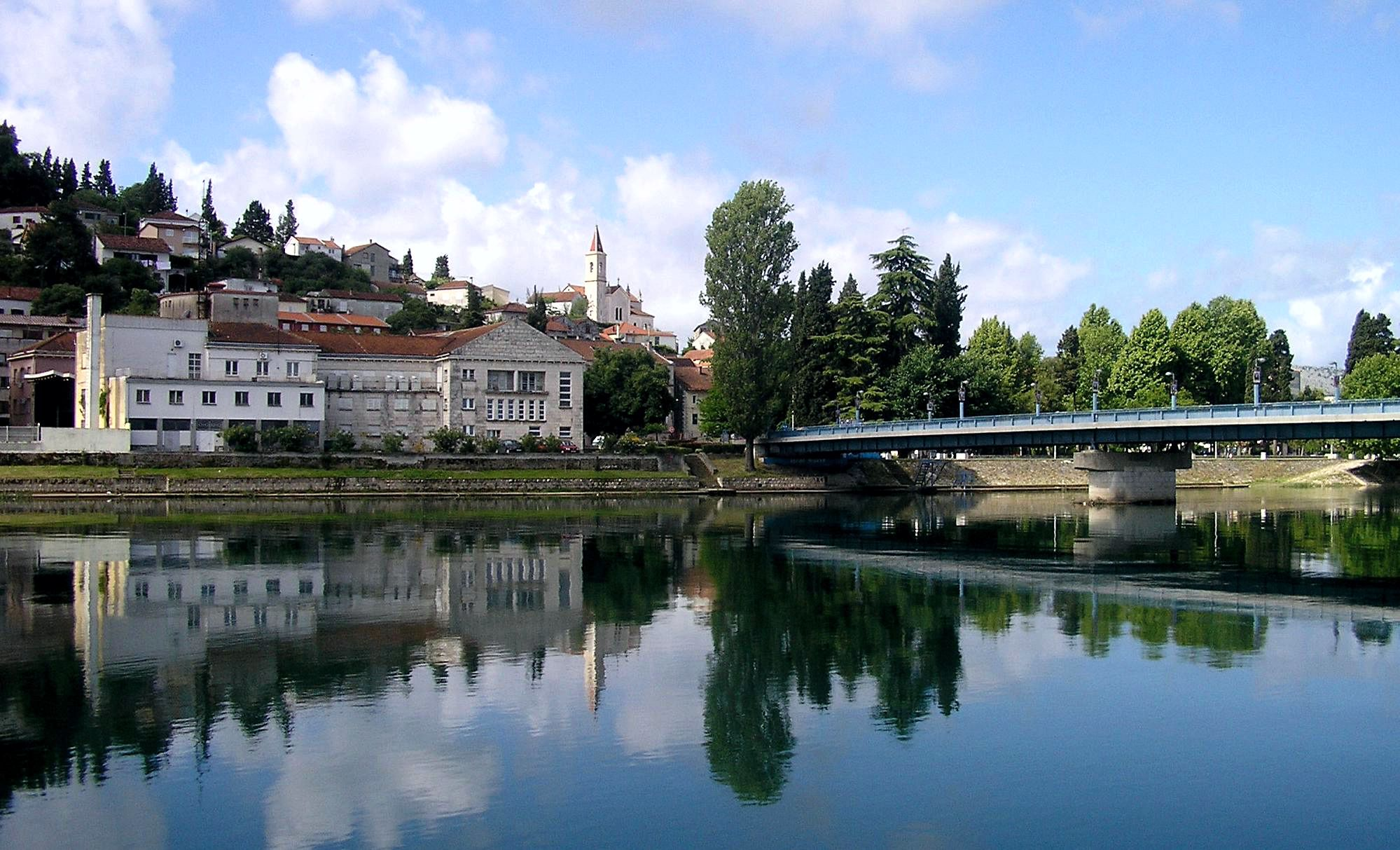
- Metković Old Town and Lučki bridge

- Coat of arms
- Interactive map of Metković
- Location of Metković in Croatia
- Coordinates: 43°03′N 17°39′E
- Country: Croatia
- Region: Dalmatia (Neretva Delta)
- County: Dubrovnik-Neretva County

Government
  - Mayor: Dalibor Milan (HDZ)
  - City Council: 15 members: HDZ, HSLS, HSU (8); MOST (7)

Area
  - Town: 51.2 km^{2} (19.8 sq mi)
  - Urban: 23.2 km^{2} (9.0 sq mi)

Population (2021)
  - Town: 15,235
  - Density: 298/km^{2} (771/sq mi)
  - Urban: 13,971
  - Urban density: 602/km^{2} (1,560/sq mi)
- Time zone: UTC+1 (CET)
  - Summer (DST): UTC+2 (CEST)
- Website: grad-metkovic.hr

Metković (Croatian pronunciation: [mêtkovitɕ]) is a town in the Dubrovnik-Neretva County of Croatia, located in the southeast of the country, on the banks of the river Neretva and on the border with Bosnia and Herzegovina.

== Climate ==
Since records began in 1997, the highest temperature recorded at the local weather station was 39.7 °C (103.5 °F), on 4 August 2013. The coldest temperature was −9.1 °C (15.6 °F), on 26 January 2000.

== Demographics ==
According to the 2021 census, its population was 15,235 with 13,971 living in the city proper.

The total population of the city municipality was 16,788 inhabitants in 2011 census, in the following settlements:

- Dubravica, population 90
- Glušci, population 76
- Metković, population 15,329
- Prud, population 497
- Vid, population 796

In the census of 2011, 96.8% of the population self-identified as Croats.

Town of Metković: Population trends 1857–2021
v

| population | 1476 | 1694 | 1931 | 2230 | 2571 | 3014 | 3271 | 3941 | 4658 | 5301 | 6358 | 8810 | 11097 | 13370 | 15384 | 16788 | 15235 |
| | 1857 | 1869 | 1880 | 1890 | 1900 | 1910 | 1921 | 1931 | 1948 | 1953 | 1961 | 1971 | 1981 | 1991 | 2001 | 2011 | 2021 |

Sources: Croatian Bureau of Statistics publications

== History ==
The city was first mentioned in a 1422 court document as a small farming town. It remained this way until the nineteenth century. During this period, the city found renewed investment from the country's Austrian rulers. With the arrival of the area's first post office and school, as well as the increase of trade with the Ottoman Empire, the city began to flourish. It was ruled by the Ottoman Empire as part of the Sanjak of Herzegovina between 1494 and 1685, then by the Republic of Venice till 1797, and finally by French Empire before the Austrian Habsburgs took over. In 1875 and 1910, Emperor Francis Joseph I visited the city.

Metković is located near the ancient Roman settlement of Narona (today Vid). Narona was established as a Roman trading post, after Rome's successful war (Illyrian Wars) with the neighboring Illyrian tribe Daors (ruins of their main city are located near Stolac), and successfully grew until the 3rd century AD. After that, it went on a steady decline, especially after a large 4th-century AD earthquake. Upon the arrival of Slavonic tribes in the mid-6th century AD, the city of Narona was abandoned, with most parts being covered under silt that was carried by the river Neretva. Only minor excavations were done, most of them being concentrated on the location of Vid. One of the city's landmarks is its Church of St. Elijah, the city's patron saint.

== Education ==
Metković has the following education facilities:

- Primary schools:
  - Stjepan Radić Primary school (Croatian language medium school)
  - Don Mihovil Pavlinović Primary school (Croatian language medium school)
- Secondary schools:
  - Metković High School
  - Metković Gymnasium (classical high school)

For tertiary education students need to move to another city, the most common destinations are: Dubrovnik (business, management, accounting, music), Split (sciences, management, accounting), Zagreb (music, arts, sciences, applied sciences, engineering, architecture, education, humanities, management, accounting, business), Zadar (humanities, education, early childhood education) and Mostar.

== Sports (most notably) ==
- NK Neretva
- ŽNK Neretva
- ONK Metković
- RK Metković – Mehanika
- VK Neretvanski gusar Metković
- Neretvian Lađa Marathon

== Notable people ==
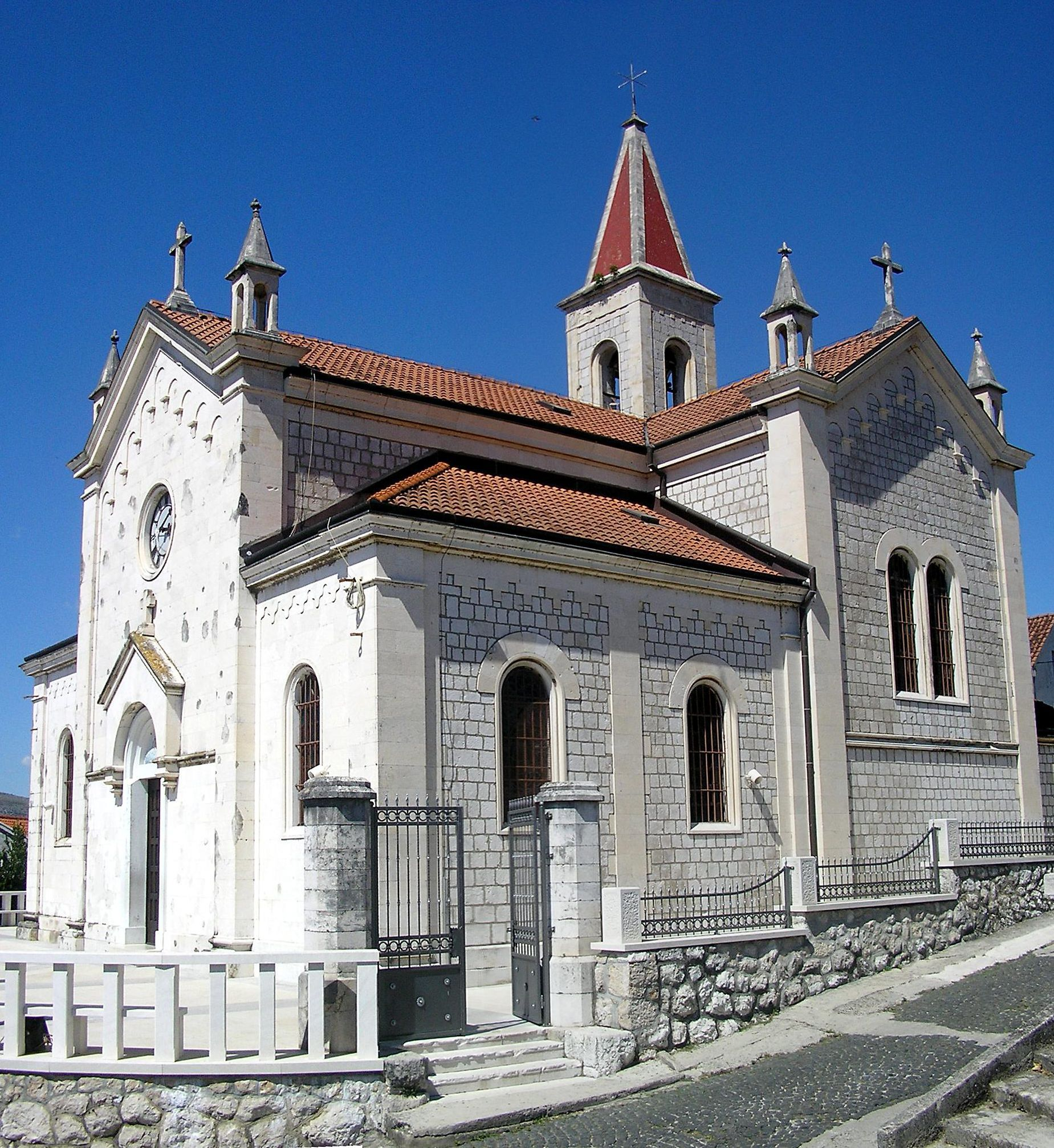
Church of Saint Elijah.

=== Clergy ===
- Marin Barišić, Metropolitan Archbishop of the Roman Catholic Archdiocese of Split-Makarska
- Josip Marija Carević (1883–1945), bishop of the Roman Catholic Diocese of Dubrovnik

=== Music ===
- Milana Vlaović, writer and music producer

=== Literature, theater, art ===
- Obrad Gluščević (1913–1980), film director
- Ivan Slamnig (1930–2001), poet
- Vera Zima, actress

=== Sport ===
- Andrija Anković (1937–1980), football (soccer) player, gold olympic medallist 1960
- Željko Babić, handball player, Croatian national team player and head-coach, bronze olympic medallist 2012 as assistant coach.
- Ivica Barbarić, football (soccer) player, Yugoslavia national team member at the 1988 Summer Olympics
- Patrik Ćavar, Croatian national team player in handball, gold olympic medallist 1996
- Ivan Čupić, Croatian national team player in handball, bronze olympic medallist 2012
- Davor Dominiković, Croatian national team player in handball, gold olympic medallist 2004
- Slavko Goluža, handball coach, Croatian national team player and head-coach, double gold olympic medallist 1996 and 2004 as player, and bronze olympic medallist 2012 as head coach.
- Sergej Jakirović, Bosnia and Herzegovina national football team player
- Vladimir Jelčić, Croatian national team player in handball, gold olympic medallist 1996, handball coach
- Nikša Kaleb, Croatian national team player in handball, gold olympic medallist 2004
- Juraj Nikolac, chess grandmaster
- Frane Nonković, Yugoslavia men's national water polo team player, silver olympic medallist 1964
- Ivica Obrvan, Croatian national team player in handball, handball coach and head coach
- Ante Pavlović, general secretary of the Croatian Football Federation and Football Association of Yugoslavia, GNK Dinamo Zagreb director
- Bruno Petković, Croatia national football team player and bronze medallist in FIFA World Cup 2022
- Bruno Sorić, rower, bronze olympic medallist 1924
- Darijo Srna, Croatia national football team player and captain
- Igor Štimac, Croatia national football team player and head coach, president of the Union of professional clubs in Croatian First Football League
- Mate Trojanović, rower, gold olympic medallist 1952
- Nemanja Calasan, Swiss basketball player of Serb origin
- Mira Golubović, Serbian volleyball player

=== Other ===
- Branka Bebić Krstulović, Miss Croatia 1994
- Luka Bebić, President of Croatian Parliament and former Minister of Defence
- Ana Bebić, opera singer; participant in Operacija trijumf
- Miljenko Grgić (aka Mike Grgich), California vintner
- Damir Magaš, first rector of the University of Zadar
- Stanko Marević, National Heroes of Yugoslavia in the Second World War
- Mate Obradović, Minister of Defence Chief inspector
- Božo Petrov, Croatian psychiatrist and politician; Deputy Prime Minister in the cabinet of Prime Minister Tihomir Orešković, former mayor of Metković
- Krešo Rakić, National Heroes of Yugoslavia in the Second World War
- Ante Šprlje, former Minister of Justice
- Nikica Gabrić, ophtamologist, politician and freemasonry leader

== See also ==
- Dalmatia
