= Ploče =

- Town
- Grad Ploče; Town of Ploče
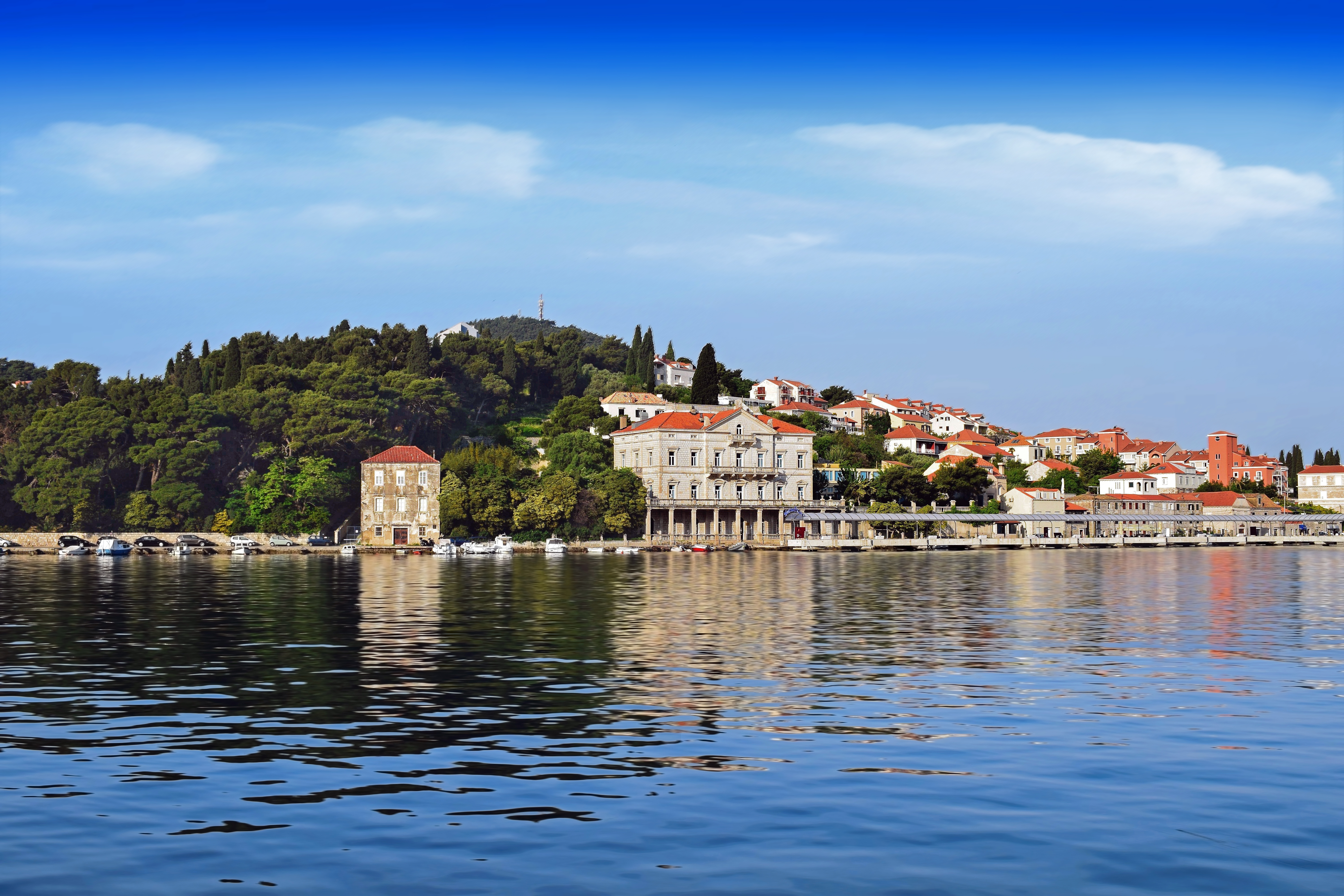
- Ploče center
- Interactive map of Ploče
- The location of Ploče within Croatia
- Coordinates: 43°03′24″N 17°25′54″E
- Country: Croatia
- Region: Dalmatia (Neretva Delta)
- County: Dubrovnik-Neretva County

Government
  - Mayor: Mišo Krstičević (SDP)

Area
  - Town: 132.1 km^{2} (51.0 sq mi)
  - Urban: 12.3 km^{2} (4.7 sq mi)
- Elevation: 0 m (0 ft)

Population (2021)
  - Town: 8,220
  - Density: 62.2/km^{2} (161/sq mi)
  - Urban: 4,711
  - Urban density: 383/km^{2} (992/sq mi)
- Time zone: UTC+1 (CET)
  - Summer (DST): UTC+2 (CEST)
- Postal code: 20 340
- Area code: 020
- Vehicle registration: DU
- Website: ploce.hr

Ploče (pronounced [plɔ̂tʃɛ]) is a town and seaport in the Dubrovnik-Neretva County of Croatia.

== Geography ==
Ploče is located on the Adriatic coast in Dalmatia just north of the Neretva Delta and is the natural seaside endpoint of most north–south routes through the central Dinaric Alps. This makes it the primary seaport used by Bosnia and Herzegovina and the endpoint of the Pan-European corridor 5C.

Čeveljuša is a toponym in Ploče, located to the east of the town, on the intersection of the D8 highway and the D425.

== Climate ==
Ploče at an elevation of 2 metres (6.6 ft) is the location of Croatia's high temperature record, measured at 42.8 °C (109.0 °F) on 4 and 5 August 1981. Records for the Ploče weather station began in 1975. The coldest temperature was −8.9 °C (16.0 °F), on 13 January 1985.

== History ==
The town was first mentioned in 1387 as Ploča. During the Kingdom of Yugoslavia, a port named Aleksandrovo after Alexander I of Yugoslavia was constructed in 1939. During the socialist Yugoslavia, between 1950 and 1954, and again from 1980 to 1990, Ploče was named Kardeljevo after the Yugoslav politician Edvard Kardelj. Some locals call their city Ploča (the stone).

== Demographics ==
According to the 2021 census, its population was 8,220 with 4,711 living in the city proper.

The total population of Ploče was 10,135 in 2011, in the following settlements:

- Baćina, population 572
- Banja, population 173
- Komin, population 1,243
- Peračko Blato, population 288
- Plina Jezero, population 44
- Ploče, population 6,013
- Rogotin, population 665
- Staševica, population 902
- Šarić Struga, population 235

In the 2011 census, the majority of its citizens were Croats at 95.93%.

Town of Ploče: Population trends 1857–2021
v

population	2204	2581	2928	3479	4028	4337	4087	4512	4865	6161	7759	8846	9726	11220	10834	10135	8220
	1857	1869	1880	1890	1900	1910	1921	1931	1948	1953	1961	1971	1981	1991	2001	2011	2021

Sources: Croatian Bureau of Statistics publications

== Port ==
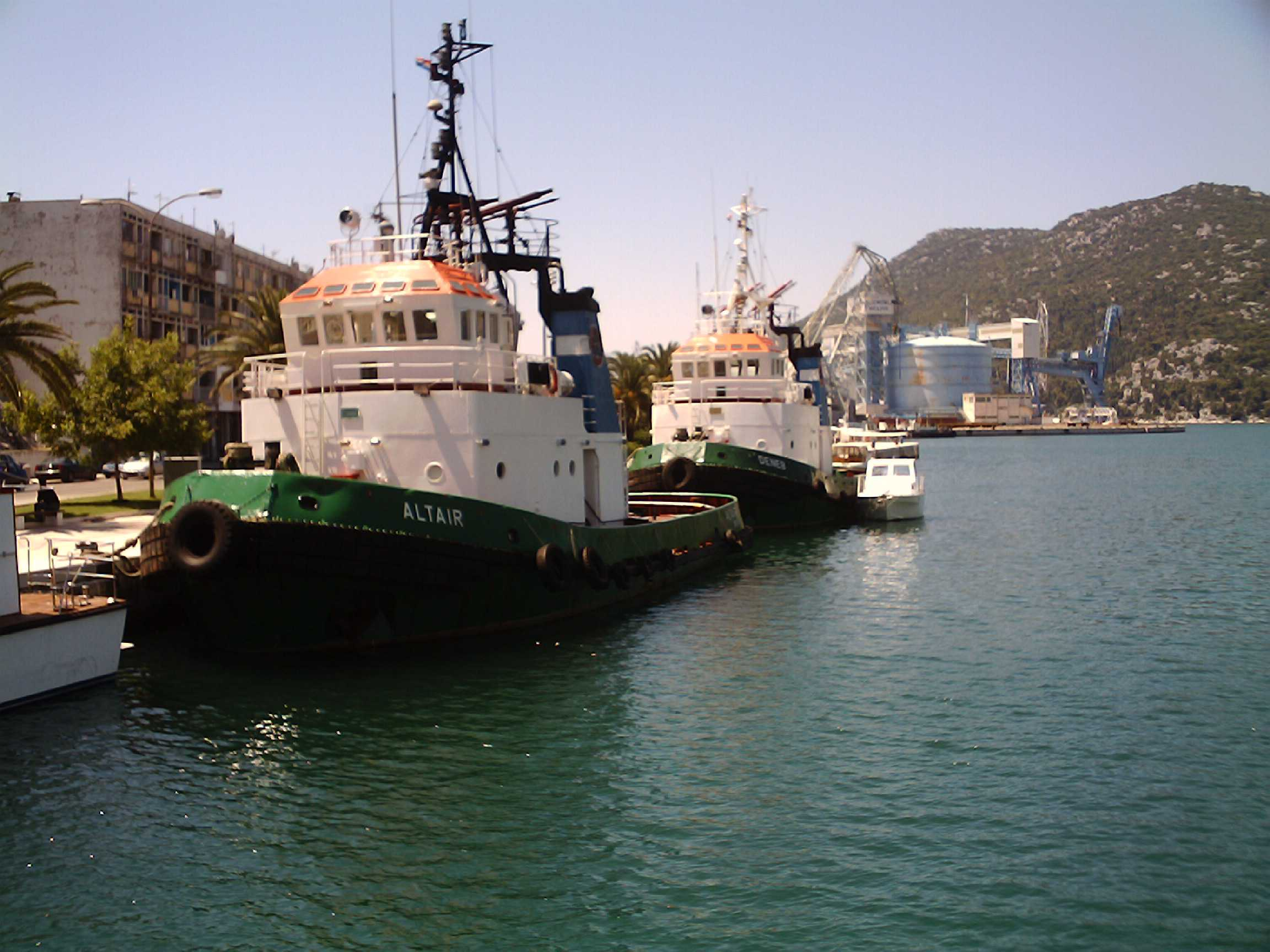
Tugboat Altair in the Port of Ploče

The Port of Ploče was first mentioned on 6 November 1387, but the building of a larger port was done in recent modern times. Work on the present day harbour first began in 1939 but was destroyed during World War II. It was rebuilt in 1945 and the village of Ploče grew up to 480 inhabitants in 1948. After the Adriatic Highway and the Sarajevo–Ploče railway (the latter was connected to the port and replaced the older narrow-gauge railway) were opened in the mid-1960s, the town experienced steady growth.

Bosnia and Croatia are currently in negotiations as regards the establishment of a "privileged economic zone" for Bosnian businesses within the Ploče port facilities, though this development is hindered by the opposition of local government, and Croatian people to the concept of a partial loss of sovereignty over the port. The Bosnian government would like a concession, with sovereignty features, for at least 99 years, whereas the Croatian government only wishes to offer commercial passage through Croatian territory for Bosnian and Herzegovinian goods. This topic was a subject of lengthy negotiations; easier passage for Croatian citizens through the narrow strip of Bosnia and Herzegovina territory (that divides Croatia's land territory) near Neum, in exchange for privileges for Bosnia and Herzegovina in Ploče. The Pelješac Bridge that bypasses Neum and Bosnian territory completely opened in 2022 although at first the project was strongly resisted by the Bosnian government.

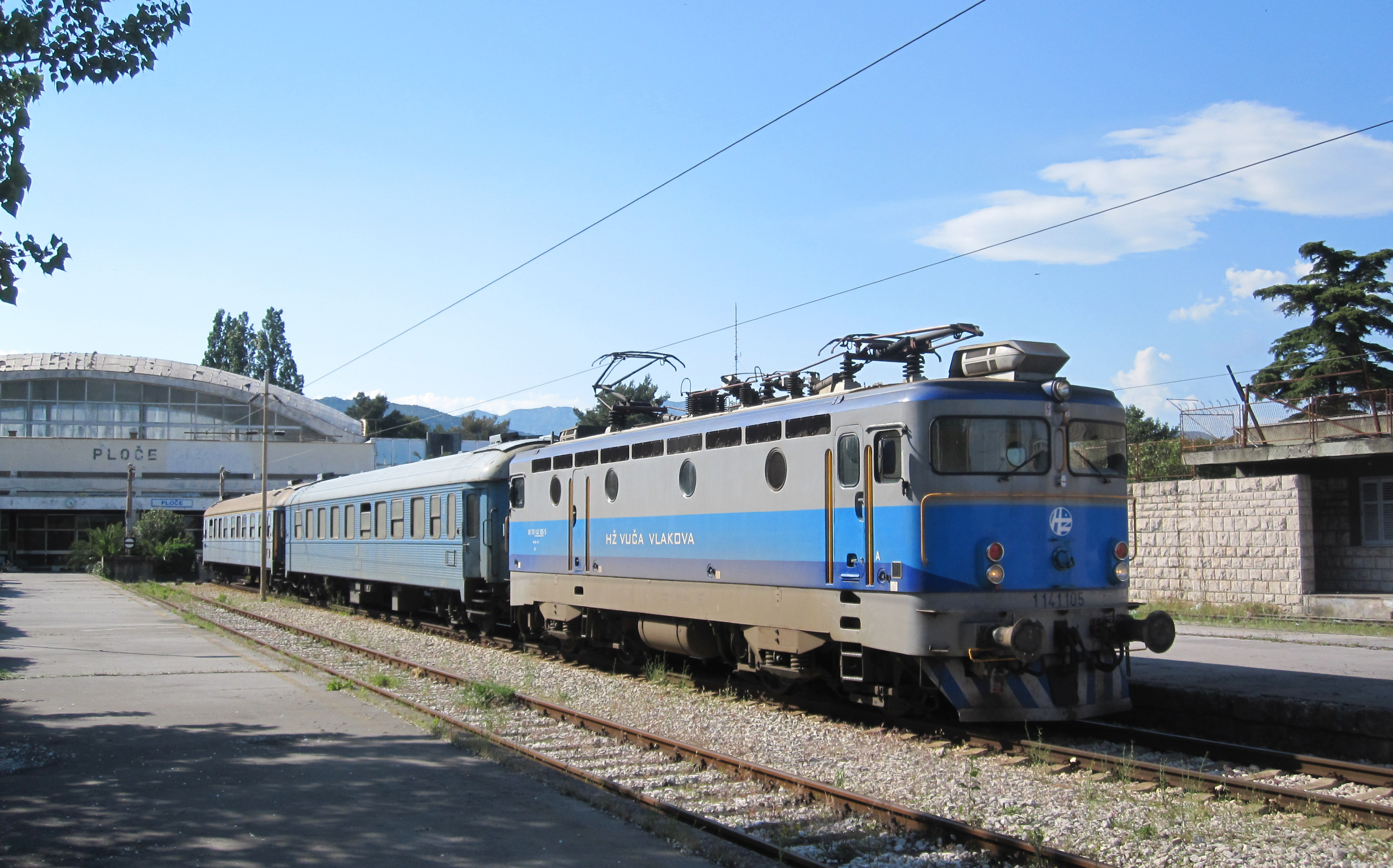
Ploče railway station

== Railway transport ==
Ploče is served by the Sarajevo–Ploče railway, a standard-gauge railway opened in 1966.

Previously, narrow-gauge railways operated in the area.

== Sister cities ==
=== Twin towns – sister cities ===
Ploče is twinned with:

- Ljubljana, Slovenia
- (Italy) Rodi Garganico
