= Komin, Dubrovnik-Neretva County =

Komin
- Village
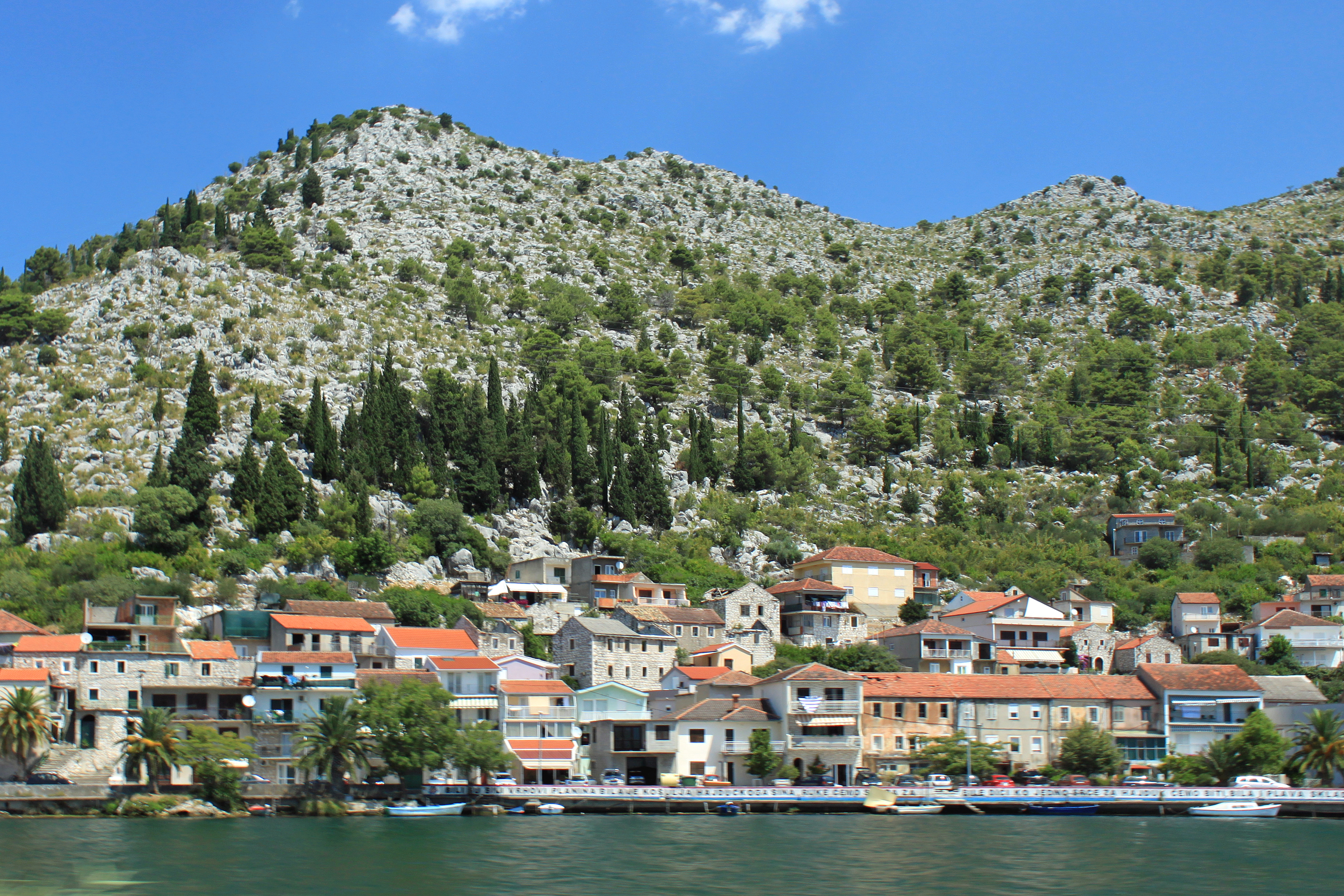

- Location within Croatia
- Coordinates: 43.04045°N 17.53718°E
- Country: Croatia
- County: Dubrovnik-Neretva County
- Municipality: Ploče

Area
  - Total: 8.1 sq mi (21.1 km^{2})

Population (2021)
  - Total: 941
  - Density: 116/sq mi (44.6/km^{2})
- Time zone: UTC+1 (CET)
  - Summer (DST): UTC+2 (CEST)

Komin is a village in Dubrovnik-Neretva County in Croatia on the river Neretva.

At one time in 1918 a hoard of about 300,000 ancient Roman coins was found here.

== Demographics ==
According to the 2021 census, its population was 941.
