= List of bridges in Croatia =

This list of bridges in Croatia lists bridges of particular historical, scenic, architectural or engineering interest. Road and railway bridges, viaducts, aqueducts and footbridges are included.

== Historical and architectural interest bridges ==
	English name	Croatian name	Distinction	Length	Type	Carries Crosses	Opened	Location	County	Ref.
1	Aqueduct of Diocletian	Dioklecijanov akvadukt		234 m (768 ft)	Masonry; Semi-circular arches	Aqueduct	4th century	Split; 43°31′27.0″N 16°29′22.3″E	Split-Dalmatia	
2	Suleiman Bridge burnt down in 1686	Most Sulejmana I.	Conception by Mimar Sinan		Trestle bridge Wood	Drava	16th century	Osijek	Osijek-Baranja	
3	Joseph's Bridge	Jozefinski most			Masonry; 2 levels, 2x3 semi-circular arches	D23 road Tounjčica	1775	Tounj; 45°14′56.4″N 15°20′04.1″E	Karlovac	(Note: The second floor was added in 1836, but destroyed during the Second World War, the structure was rebuilt in 1972.)
4	Sisak Old Bridge	Sisački Stari most	Span : 41.8 m (137 ft)	204 m (669 ft)	Masonry; 7 arches	Road bridge Kupa	1934	Sisak; 45°28′57.9″N 16°22′12.0″E	Sisak-Moslavina	
5	Kosinj Bridge	Kosinjski most		70 m (230 ft)	Masonry; 3 arches	Road bridge Lika (river)	1936	Gornji Kosinj–Donji Kosinj; 44°44′06.3″N 15°16′26.3″E	Lika-Senj	
6	Pedestrian bridge (Osijek)	Viseći pješački most u Osijeku		210 m (690 ft)	Suspension; Steel	Footbridge; Drava	1980	Osijek; 45°33′48.6″N 18°41′07.2″E	Osijek-Baranja	
7	Bridge over Foša in Trogir	Most preko Foše u Trogiru		32 m (105 ft)	Arch; Steel	Footbridge; Foša waterway	2024	Trogir; 43°31′2″N 16°14′52″E	Split-Dalmatia	

== Major road and railway bridges ==
This table presents the structures with spans greater than 100 meters (non-exhaustive list).

	English name	Croatian name	Span	Length	Type	Carries Crosses	Opened	Location	County	Ref.
1	Krk Bridge	Krčki most	390 m (1,280 ft)	1,430 m (4,690 ft)	Arch; Concrete deck arch	D102 road Adriatic Sea; Krk Channel	1980	Krk–Šmrika; 45°14′50.5″N 14°34′14.5″E	Primorje-Gorski Kotar	(Note: The two bridges are not continuous, the given length includes a 98 metres (322 ft) land part on the islet of Sveti Marko.)
2	Franjo Tuđman Bridge	Most dr. Franja Tuđmana	304 m (997 ft)	481 m (1,578 ft)	Cable-stayed; Composite steel/concrete deck, concrete pylon	D8 road Rijeka Dubrovačka	2001	Dubrovnik; 42°40′05.2″N 18°04′45.9″E	Dubrovnik-Neretva	
3	Pelješac Bridge	Pelješki most	285 m (935 ft)(x5)	2,404 m (7,887 ft)	Cable-stayed; Steel box girder deck, concrete pylons 118+203+5x285+203+118	2 lanes road bridge Bay of Mali Ston; Neretva Channel	2022	Pelješac–Komarna; 42°55′54.7″N 17°32′10.6″E	Dubrovnik-Neretva	
4	Šibenik Bridge	Šibenski most	246 m (807 ft)	390 m (1,280 ft)	Arch; Concrete deck arch	Road bridge Krka	1966	Šibenik; 43°45′46.0″N 15°50′56.7″E	Šibenik-Knin	
5	Krk West Bridge	Krčki most	244 m (801 ft)	1,430 m (4,690 ft)	Arch; Concrete deck arch	D102 road Adriatic Sea; Krk Channel	1980	Krk–Šmrika; 45°14′38.0″N 14°33′54.1″E	Primorje-Gorski Kotar	
6	Drava Highway Bridge	Most Drava (A5)	220 m (720 ft)	2,485 m (8,153 ft)	Cable-stayed; Composite steel/concrete deck, concrete pylons 100+220+100	A5 motorway European route E73; Drava	2022	Osijek; 45°37′03.7″N 18°35′06.5″E	Osijek-Baranja	
7	Krka Bridge	Most Krka	204 m (669 ft)	391 m (1,283 ft)	Arch; Concrete deck arch	A1 motorway European route E65; European route E71; Krka	2004	Skradin; 43°48′31.4″N 15°54′57.5″E	Šibenik-Knin	
8	Maslenica Bridge (A1)	Maslenički most (autocesta A1)	200 m (660 ft)	378 m (1,240 ft)	Arch; Concrete deck arch	A1 motorway European route E65; European route E71; Adriatic Sea; Novsko Ždrilo	1997	Maslenica; 44°14′12.7″N 15°31′20.4″E	Zadar	
9	Pag Bridge	Paški most	193 m (633 ft)	280 m (920 ft)	Arch; Concrete deck arch	D106 road Ljubačka Vrata Strait	1968	Pag–Ražanac; 44°19′29.6″N 15°15′30.5″E	Lika-Senj; Zadar	
10	Sveti Martin na Muri Bridge	Svetomartinski most na Muri	42 m (138 ft)	105 m (344 ft)	Box girder Steel	Road bridge over Mura River	2006	Sveti Martin na Muri–Hotiza (in Slovenia); 46°32′05.26″N 16°21′37.05″E	Međimurje; Croatia	
11	51st Division Bridge	Batinski most	170 m (560 ft)	636 m (2,087 ft)	Box girder Steel; 96+170+96	D212 road Danube	1974	Batina–Bezdan; 45°50′38.6″N 18°51′26.9″E	Osijek-Baranja; Serbia	
12	Ilok–Bačka Palanka Bridge	Most Ilok-Bačka Palanka	160 m (520 ft)	725 m (2,379 ft)	Box girder Steel; 100+160+100	D2 road Danube	1974; 2002	Ilok–Bačka Palanka; 45°13′58.0″N 19°24′06.2″E	Vukovar-Srijem; Serbia	
13	Limska Draga Viaduct	Viadukt Limska Draga	160 m (520 ft)	552 m (1,811 ft)	Box girder Steel; 80+100+160+100+80	A9 motorway European route E751; Limska Draga	1991	Kanfanar; 45°07′14.8″N 13°48′01.4″E	Istria	
14	Maslenica Bridge (D8)	Maslenički most	155 m (509 ft)	315 m (1,033 ft)	Arch; Steel deck arch	D8 road Adriatic Sea; Novsko Ždrilo	1961	Maslenica; 44°13′29.6″N 15°31′51.7″E	Zadar	
15	Erdut–Bogojevo Road Bridge		155 m (509 ft)	640 m (2,100 ft)	Box girder Steel; 100+155+100	D213 road Danube	1980	Erdut–Bogojevo; 45°31′28.5″N 19°05′05.2″E	Osijek-Baranja; Serbia	
16	Cetina Bridge (Omiš) under construction	Most Cetina (Omiš)	152 m (499 ft)	216 m (709 ft)	Box girder Steel; 30+152+30	Road bridge Cetina		Omiš; 43°26′58.2″N 16°41′37.8″E	Split-Dalmatia	
17	Rječina Bridge	Most Rječina	146 m (479 ft)	208 m (682 ft)	Box girder Prestressed concrete V-shaped legs Twin bridges	A7 motorway European route E61; Rječina	1984; 2009	Rijeka; 45°20′05.3″N 14°27′26.4″E	Primorje-Gorski Kotar	
18	Cetina Bridge (Trilj)	Most Cetina (Trilj)	140 m (460 ft)	236 m (774 ft)	Arch; Concrete deck arch	Road bridge Cetina	2007	Trilj; 43°35′09.1″N 16°43′09.9″E	Split-Dalmatia	
19	Željeznički Bridge	Željeznički most	135 m (443 ft)	308 m (1,010 ft)	Arch; Steel tied arch Bow-string bridge	Zagreb–Rijeka railway Zidani Most–Novska Railway; Sava	1934	Zagreb; 45°47′07.2″N 15°57′21.7″E	Zagreb County	
20	Morinje Bridge	Most Morinje	134 m (440 ft)	321 m (1,053 ft)	Arch; Steel deck arch	D8 road Morinje Bay	1964	[[Brodarica, Šibenik|]]–Žaborić; 43°40′22.5″N 15°55′40.5″E	Šibenik-Knin	
21	Županja-Orašje Bridge		134 m (440 ft)	792 m (2,598 ft)	Box girder Steel; 85+134+85	D55 road Sava	1968	Županja–Orašje; 45°02′16.9″N 18°42′10.6″E	Vukovar-Srijem; Bosnia and Herzegovina	
22	Svilaj Bridge	Most Svilaj	130 m (430 ft)	660 m (2,170 ft)	Box girder Composite steel/concrete Twin bridges 100+130+100	A5 motorway Sava	2019	Svilaj–Donji Svilaj; 45°06′20.6″N 18°18′53.3″E	Brod-Posavina; Bosnia and Herzegovina	
23	Kamačnik Bridge	Most Kamačnik	127 m (417 ft)	240 m (790 ft)	Box girder Prestressed concrete Twin bridges 71+127+24; 70+125+23	A6 motorway European route E65; Kamačnik stream	2003	Vrbovsko; 45°21′31.8″N 15°03′56.5″E	Primorje-Gorski Kotar	
24	Brčko Railroad Bridge		126 m (413 ft)	775 m (2,543 ft)	Truss; Steel; 92+126+92	Railway bridge Sava	1968	Gunja–Brčko; 44°52′05.8″N 18°49′51.9″E	Vukovar-Srijem; Bosnia and Herzegovina	
25	Homeland Bridge	Domovinski most	120 m (390 ft)	879 m (2,884 ft)	Extradosed; Concrete box girder deck, concrete pylons 72+120+72	4 lanes road bridge Sava	2006	Zagreb; 45°46′13.6″N 16°04′11.6″E	Zagreb County	
26	Jasenovac Bridge	Obnova mosta preko Save u Jasenovcu	120 m (390 ft)	235 m (771 ft)	Box girder Steel; 60+120+55	D47 road Sava	2005	Jasenovac; 45°16′07.5″N 16°54′56.3″E	Sisak-Moslavina	
27	Old Krka River Bridge	Most Skradin	110 m (360 ft)		Arch; Concrete filled steel tubular deck arch	D56 road Krka	1955	Skradin; 43°49′07.1″N 15°56′05.4″E	Šibenik-Knin	
28	Rogotinski Bridge	Rogotinski most	110 m (360 ft)	414 m (1,358 ft)	Box girder Prestressed concrete	D8 road Neretva	1966	Rogotin; 43°02′19.2″N 17°29′05.9″E	Dubrovnik-Neretva	
29	Liberty Bridge, Zagreb	Most slobode	100 m (330 ft)	805 m (2,641 ft)	Arch; Steel deck arch	Road bridge Sava	1959	Zagreb; 45°47′21.9″N 15°58′46.6″E	Zagreb County	
30	Drežnik Viaduct	Vijadukt Drežnik	70 m (230 ft)	2,485 m (8,153 ft)	Beam bridge Prestressed concrete	A1 motorway European route E65; European route E71; Kupa	2001	Karlovac; 45°30′37.5″N 15°31′30.1″E	Karlovac	
31	Mirna Viaduct	Most Mirna	70 m (230 ft)	1,378 m (4,521 ft)	Beam bridge Composite steel/concrete deck	A9 motorway European route E751; Mirna	2005	Novigrad; 45°19′45.8″N 13°37′37.3″E	Istria	

== Notes and references ==
- Notes
- Nicolas Janberg. "International Database for Civil and Structural Engineering". Structurae.com.
- Others references

== See also ==
- Transport in Croatia
- Highways in Croatia
- Rail transport in Croatia
- Geography of Croatia
