= List of Croatian products with protected designation of origin =

There are 46 Croatian agricultural and food products registered in the European Union as a protected designation of origin or a protected designation of geographical origin, European marks of authenticity by the European Commission).

== Products ==
Cheese

- Bjelovarski Kvargl
- Lički škripavac (from Lika)
- Pag cheese (from Pag island)

Honey

- Goranski medun (from Gorski kotar)
- Slavonski med (Slavonian honey) (from Slavonia)
- Zagorski bagremov med (from Hrvatsko zagorje)

Meat

- Baranjski kulen
- Dalmatinska janjetina (Dalmatian lamb)
- Dalmatinska panceta
- Dalmatinska pečenica
- Dalmatinski pršut
- Drniški pršut
- Istarski pršut (Istrski pršut)
- Lička janjetina (Likan lamb)
- Krčki pršut
- Malostonska kamenica
- Međimursko meso ‘z tiblice
- Meso istarskog goveda – boškarina (Meso istrskega goveda – boškarina; Meat of Istrian cattle – Boškarin)
- Paška janjetina (lamb from Pag island)
- Samoborska češnjovka (Samoborska češnofka; smoked saussage from Samobor)
- Slavonska crna svinja (Slavonian black pig, hr)
- Slavonski kulen (Slavonski kulin; Slavonian kulen/kulin)
- Zagorski puran (turkey meat from Hrvatsko zagorje)

Fruits and vegetables

- Brački varenik
- Neretvanska mandarina
- Komiški rogač (Komižan carob)
- Lički krumpir (Likan potato)
- Ogulinsko kiselo zelje/Ogulinski kiseli kupus
- Varaždinsko zelje

Olive oils

- Bračko maslinovo ulje
- Ekstra djevičansko maslinovo ulje Cres
- Korčulansko maslinovo ulje
- Krčko maslinovo ulje
- Šoltansko maslinovo ulje

Other oils

- Varaždinsko bučino ulje (Varaždin pumpkin seed oil)

Pastry

- Lumblija (aromatic sweet bread)
- Poljički soparnik (Poljički zeljanik or Poljički uljenjak)
- Rudarska greblica
- Varaždinski klipič
- Zagorski mlinci
- Zagorski štrukli (Zagorski štruklji)

Sea products

- Novigrad Mussel, Mytilus galloprovincialis cultivated in farms in the Novigrad Sea and Novsko Ždrilo
- Paška sol (sea salt from Pag island)

== Joint designation ==
Product name	Area	Short description	Image
Istra	parts of Croatian and Slovenian Istria	Istra is an extra-virgin olive oil, produced in an area where olive trees have been present since Ancient Roman times. The olive oil is bitter and has a high oleic acid content (generally >74 %) and linolenic acid <10 %.	
Istarski pršut / Istrski pršut	parts of Croatian and Slovenian Istria	Istarski pršut (Croatian) / Istrski pršut (Slovenian) is a "dry-cured meat product made of a pig's ham without the foot, the skin and the subcutaneous fat but with the pelvic bones, which is dry-brined with sea salt and spices, air-dried without smoking and then dried and matured for at least 12 months", which is similar to prosciuto.	
