= Maslenica Bridge =

Maslenica Bridge is the name of two bridges spanning the Novsko ždrilo strait in Croatia:

- Maslenica Bridge (A1), built in 1997 ("the new bridge")
- Maslenica Bridge (D8), built in 1961, destroyed in 1991, rebuilt in 2005 ("the old bridge")
