= Modrić =

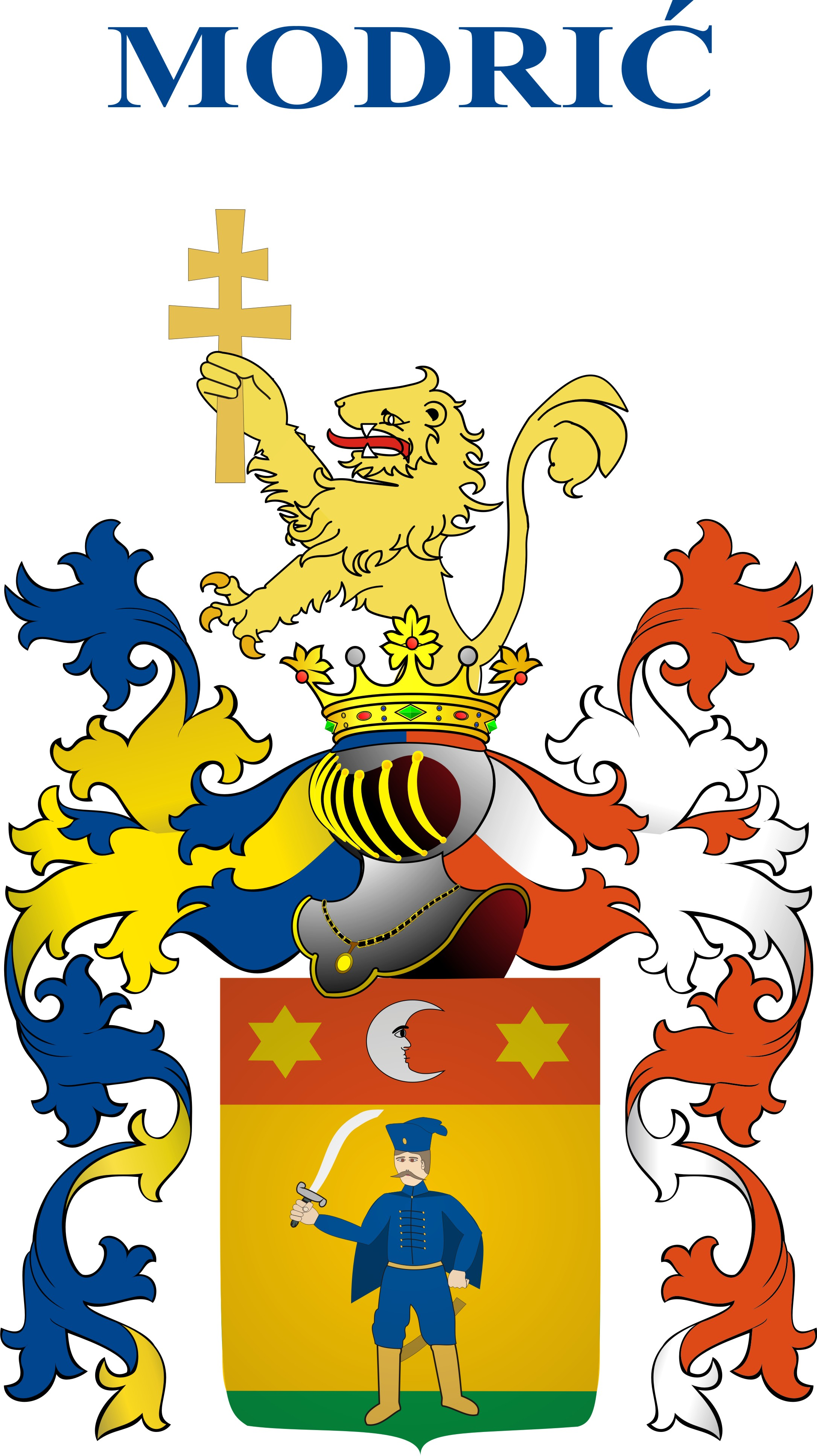
- Coat of arms of Modrovich aliter Modrich, 1791
- Pronunciation: Serbo-Croatian pronunciation: [mǒːdritɕ]
- Gender: Masculine
- Language: Croatian

Origin
- Language: Proto-Slavic
- Origin: *modrъ > mȍdar
- Derivation: Modro / Modrić
- Meaning: "blue"
- Region of origin: Croatia

Other names
- Variant forms: Modrič, Modric, Modrich, Modritsch, Modrick, Moderick,
- Derivatives: Modrović, Modrovich
- See also: Modrinić, Modrovčić, Modrušan, Modrušić

Modrić is a Croatian surname primarily from Zadar-Benkovac area in North Dalmatia. In Zaton Obrovački in the Benkovac area, every third inhabitant had the family name Modrić. There is also a hamlet nearby named Modrići. Today, circa 1930 people carry it, making it the 212th most numerous surname in Croatia, almost doubling the 1948 census number, in almost all Croatian counties and many cities and villages, but mostly Zagreb, Glavice near Sinj, Rijeka, Zadar, Split, Obrovac among others, and less in Northern Croatia and Slavonia. According to some sources, the noble part of the family is from Podgorje area on the littoral slopes of Velebit, between Senj in the North and river Zrmanja in the South, where came at least in the 17th century from Dalmatia (Podzrmanje). Outside Croatia, due to migration the surname can be found in Algeria, United States, Germany, Austria, Argentina, Slovenia, France, Serbia, Italy, Australia and so on.

== Etymology ==
The surname is most probably of nickname origin, possibly of physical trait, and its root modr- derives from Slavic adjective mȍdar meaning "which is the color of a bright sky", "blue", while in regard to human body a shade of blue that is closer to purple. Another possibility is to be related to the traditional shirt for the whole body called "modra", "modrna", "modrina", which was of blue color and was mostly worn by young boys until school age when was replaced by trousers, while in Western Herzegovina traditional pants with "turom" were also called "modrine", probably because they were of blue color.

Of the similar etymological derivation are surnames Modrič, Modrinić, Modrušan, Modrušić, and oeconyms like village Modruš, small littoral settlement Modrič (once seaport over which were two forts) with toponyms Modrič cove and Modrič cave in the Southern part of Podgorje (Velebit Channel), hamlets Gornji and Donji Modrič in Rogoznica municipality, hamlet Modrići which is part of village Zaton Obrovački, as well toponyms like Modrić dolac (Modrić dell) in which is located the Velebit botanical garden part of Northern Velebit National Park, Modrića gradina and Modrića gomile at village Ježević near Koljane in Cetina region.

== History ==
It is considered that the (noble) family is an old Croatian family from the Zadar hinterland in Dalmatia, which ancestors migrated to Lika and Krbava. After the Ottoman invasion of the region by the end of 15th and beginning of the 16th century, the family also moved to Hrvatsko Zagorje (Varaždin County, Koprivnica-Križevci County), while a branch at the beginning of the 18th century to Senj. According to another consideration, they or some of the surname holders were of Bunjevci origin from Dalmatia and Western Herzegovina. The surname was also present among the Bunjevci-Dalmatini community around Szeged and Baja, Hungary.

In North Dalmatia, in 1468, certain Ivan Modrić or Slovinja (Slovigna) led the citizens with the help of Venice to enter the council of Pag because of the conflicts around the many pastures that mostly became the property of the nobility. In the mid 18th century, Lovre Modrić was a Franciscan parish priest in area of Jasenice. In 1777 was mentioned elder Ante Modrich in Zaton. In 1787 was recorded Vincenzo Modrich in Starigrad.

In Podgorje-Lika, it is considered Modrići belonged to the first and older migration of Bunjevci from Northern Dalmatia to Velebit Podgorje, which probably happened in 1645. In 1694 was mentioned Rade Modrić, in 1708 died Ivan Modrić, and in 1727 was mentioned Mihovil Modrić aliter Mileta. In 1712/1714 census of Lika and Krbava in Lovinac was recorded certain landless peasant Vid Modrich Bunieuacz (Bunjevac), a migrant from Šugarje, descending from Krmpote. Modrić families had distinctive nicknames, Grlići, Josetići, Jukići, Jurići, Kajići, Mijadžići, Pavlovići, Perići, Vabići, Bralići, Kušljini. In the 20th century, population of hamlet Modrići and near villages on the slopes of Velebit was considered to belong to multilayered regional identity Podgorci being a synonym for Bunjevci. Some members also reached nobility status, in 1649 was recognized and confirmed the nobility to Nicolaus [Nikola] Modrich by Croatian Sabor. A branch of the family, with a surname form Modrović (Modrovich aliter Modrich), was part of the Croatian-Hungarian nobility since the end of the 18th century, when Johann [Ivan] Modrovich aliter Modrich, with brother Peter-Martin and children, received the noble title with a bit different coat of arms by Leopold II on 21 July 1791, which was confirmed by Sabor in 1792. The family members mostly served a military-officer role in the Military Frontier, while others were traders and entrepreneurs.

In Middle Dalmatia, in the territory of Roman Catholic Archdiocese of Split-Makarska, specifically Kamen of Split, in 1659 were recorded surnames Modrić and Modro. In 1673, in Sućuraj on Hvar was recorded Mihovil Modrić. In the territory of Cetina region they arrived from Livanjsko or Duvanjsko field. In 1698 was mentioned family of Ivan Modrić in banderium of harambaša Jakov Jadrijević who fled from Podhum near Livno to Glavice near Sinj. In 1709, in the same banderium was recorded family of Ilija Modro. In 1710, in the territory of Vrlika was recorded family of Nikola Modrić Petrov (son of Petar), and again in 1725 in the list of believers of the Split Archdiocese, where they still lived in near village Ježević until WWII.

In Northern Croatia, a 1519 record of nobles from Zagreb and Križevac county possibly mentions Mirko and Andrija Modrić or Mudrić from Cunovec (Mwdrich de Czunovecz), a settlement which existed until the 19th century. In 1647, Ivan Modrić was mentioned among nobles who received estate in Pišćanovec and Čurilovec according to the charter by Ivan III Drašković, and probably the same Ivan Modrić wrote a letter in Varaždin to Juraj Otmić in 1673. In Međimurje and Palinovec were recorded Modrich and Modrics in 1788, in Črečen Modrits in 1844, and in Jurčevec Modrics in 1900.

== Notable people ==
- Josip (Giuseppe) Modrić (born circa 1855), author and journalist who traveled in Europe (from Dalmatia to Russia) and South America (Argentina), most notably writing La Dalmazia romana-veneta-moderna. Note e ricordi di viaggio (1892).
- Josip Modrić (1863–1893), priest of the Diocese of Senj-Modruš and professor of moral theology at the Theological Faculty of the University of Zagreb.
- Paul L. Modrich (born 1946), American biochemist of Croatian descent who received a Nobel Prize in Chemistry in 2015.
- Stipe Modrić (born 1979), Croatian basketball player born in Sinj who plays in Slovenian league as well Slovenia national basketball team.
- Luka Modrić (born 1985), Croatian footballer born in Zadar who plays in AC Milan, captains the Croatian national football team, and received the UEFA, FIFA and Ballon d'Or awards in 2018.
- Ildy Modrovich, American screenwriter and television showrunner.
