= Rovanjska =

Village in Dalmatia, Croatia

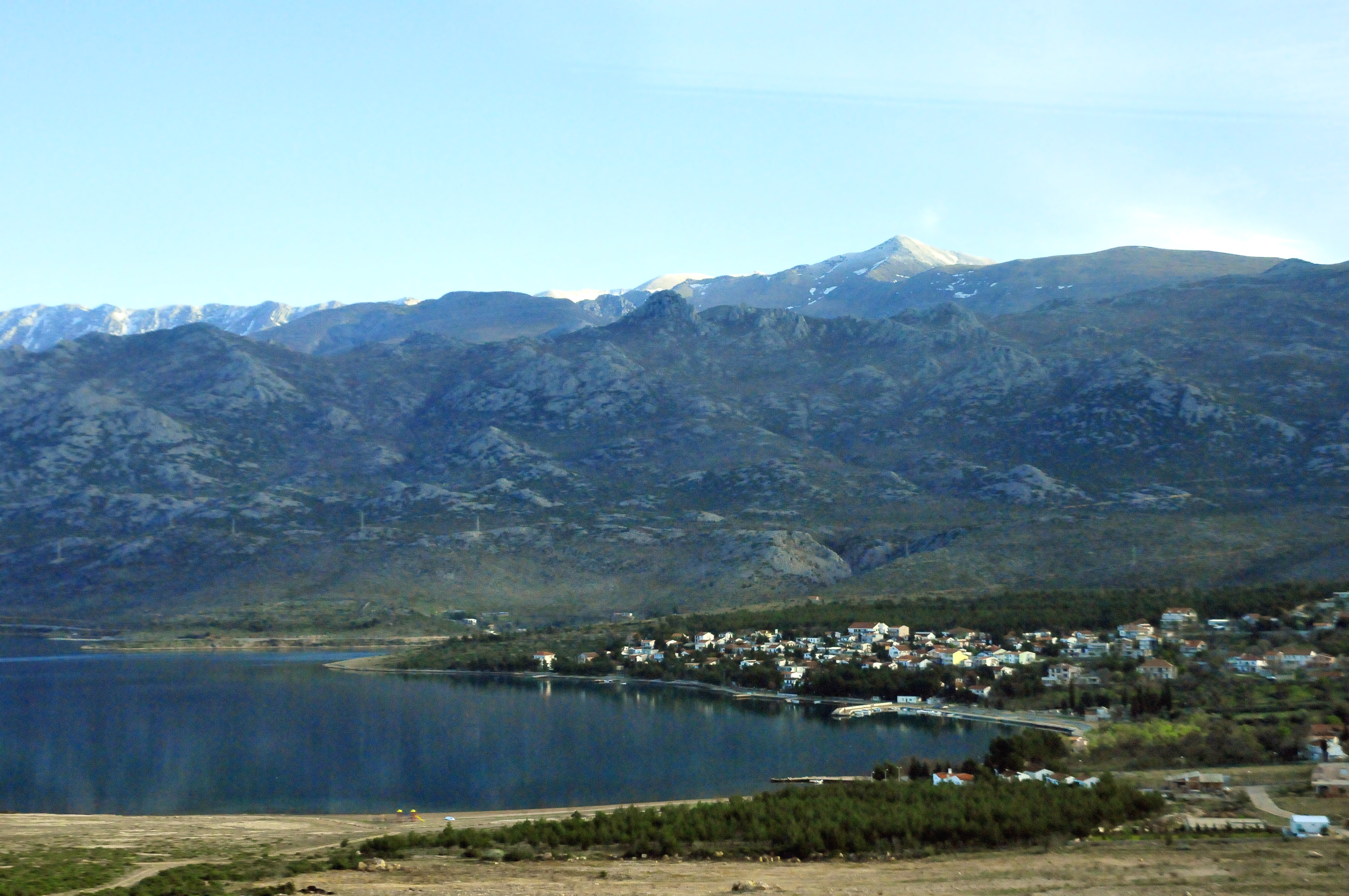
- Interactive map of Rovanjska
- Location of Rovanjska in Croatia
- Coordinates: 44°15′6″N 15°32′27″E
- Country: Croatia
- County: Zadar County
- Municipality: Jasenice

Area
  - Total: 21.7 km^{2} (8.4 sq mi)

Population (2021)
  - Total: 302
  - Density: 13.9/km^{2} (36.0/sq mi)
- Time zone: UTC+1 (CET)
  - Summer (DST): UTC+2 (CEST)

Rovanjska is a village in the Jasenice municipality of Zadar County, Croatia.

== Geography ==
Rovanjska is located on the northeastern coast of the Velebit Channel, at the foot of the southern slopes of the Velebit mountain range. It lies approximately 30 kilometres northeast of Zadar and is situated along the Adriatic Highway (D8), near the Maslenica Bridge and the southern entrance to Paklenica National Park. The surrounding landscape consists of karst terrain, steep mountain slopes and the Adriatic coastline. The nearby Velebit Nature Park and Paklenica National Park are important natural features of the area.

== Cultural heritage ==
- Church of St. George (9th century)

It belongs to the southern Dalmatian type of early Croatian church architecture. The oldest part of the church is covered with an elliptical dome and is dated to the 9th century, and in the whole of Croatia there are only three church buildings of this type, located on the Zadar islands. In the period from the 11th to the 13th century the church was expanded, and during that time the bell-gable was also built. Next to the church there was an old medieval cemetery with stećci, which however was devastated during the construction of the new cemetery. To the right of the church, remains of a Roman villa rustica or a small Roman settlement were found.

It was first recorded as a standalone settlement in the 2021 census, whereas before that the municipality consisted of a single settlement. In 2011, local representatives proposed separating Rovanjska and nearby Maslenica from Jasenice.
