= Zaton Obrovački =

- Village
- Interactive map of Zaton Obrovački
- Location within Croatia
- Coordinates: 44°13′01″N 15°41′30″E
- Country: Croatia
- Region: Dalmatia
- County: Zadar
- Municipality: Jasenice

Area
  - Total: 35.4 km^{2} (13.7 sq mi)
- Elevation: 152 m (499 ft)

Population (2021)
  - Total: 95
  - Density: 2.7/km^{2} (7.0/sq mi)
- Time zone: UTC+1 (CET)
  - Summer (DST): UTC+2 (CEST)
- Postal code: 23450
- Area code: 023

Zaton Obrovački (Croatian pronunciation: [zǎːton obrǒʋat͡ʃkiː]) is a village in the municipality of Jasenice, Zadar County, in Croatia.

== Overview ==
It lies on the southern slopes of the mountain Velebit, in the vicinity of the border between regions of Lika and Dalmatia. It is situated 4 kilometers north of Obrovac, 22 kilometers south-west of Gračac, and 45 kilometers north of Zadar.

Several hamlets were and some still are part of the village, including Bravarica, Čude-Gačine, Dominjak, Glavica, Grkovac-Brina, Jokići, Maričići-Glavica, Meki Doci, Modrići-Glavica, Modrići-Tomići, Podkosa, and Rastovac.

== History ==
During the Croatian War of Independence, on 18 December 1991 one civilian of hamlet Modrići, Luka Modrić (grandfather of Croatian footballer Luka Modrić), was executed near his house during the night while he was returning from goat grazing, as well as six other elderly civilians in the near village of Jasenice, by Serb rebels who were part of the police of SAO Krajina. In 1993, between 26 January and 2 July, another seven Croat civilians of Zaton Obrovački were murdered: Petar Maričić, Ika Modrić, Anica Modrić, Marija Modrić, Milica Modrić, Ružica Modrić, and Marijan Modrić.

== People from Zaton Obrovački ==
- Luka Modrić
- Dado Pršo
