= Paul L. Modrich =

American biochemist and Nobel laureate (born 1946)

Paul Modrich
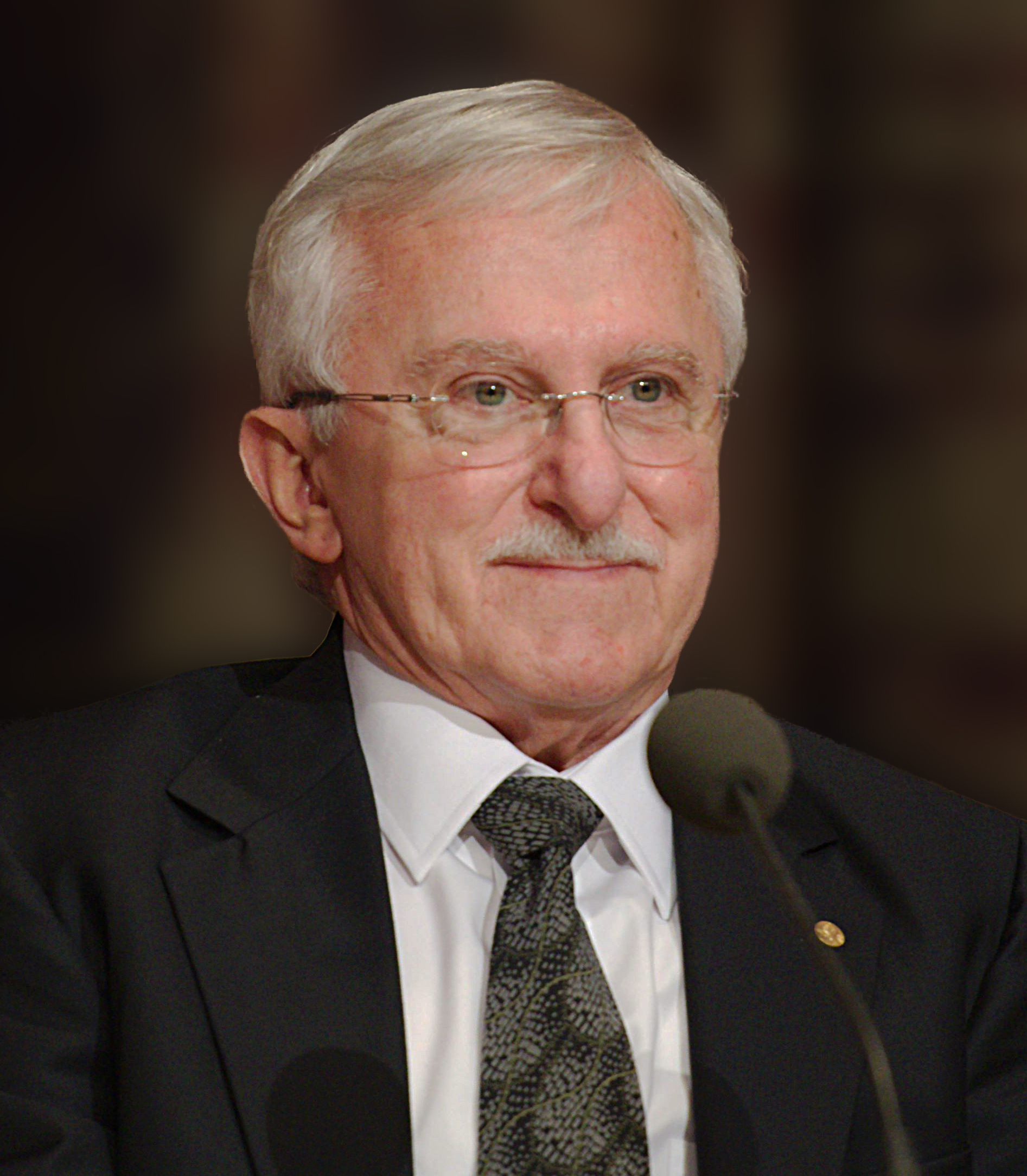
- Paul L. Modrich in December 2015
- Born: Paul Lawrence Modrich; June 13, 1946 (age 80); Raton, New Mexico, U.S.
- Education: MIT; Stanford University (PhD)
- Known for: Clarification of cellular resistance to carcinogens Modrich–Lehman unit
- Awards: Regeneron Science Talent Search (1964); Camille Dreyfus Teacher-Scholar Awards (1977); Pfizer Award in Enzyme Chemistry (1983); Member of the National Academy of Sciences (1993); Charles S. Mott Prize (1996); Pasarow Award (1998); Nobel Prize in Chemistry (2015); North Carolina Award (2016); Mendel Lecture (2017)
- Scientific career
- Fields: DNA mismatch repair
- Workplaces: Duke University; Howard Hughes Medical Institute; University of California, Berkeley
- Thesis: Structure, mechanism and biological role of E. coli DNA ligase (1973)
- Doctoral advisor: Robert Lehman
- Website: scholars.duke.edu/person/modrich

Paul Lawrence Modrich (born June 13, 1946) is an American biochemist, James B. Duke Professor of Biochemistry at Duke University and Investigator at the Howard Hughes Medical Institute. He is known for his research on DNA mismatch repair. Modrich received the Nobel Prize in Chemistry 2015, jointly with Aziz Sancar and Tomas Lindahl.

== Early life and education ==
Paul Modrich presenting himself

Modrich was born on June 13, 1946, in Raton, New Mexico to Laurence Modrich and Margaret McTurk. He has a younger brother Dave. His father was a biology teacher and coach for basketball, football and tennis at Raton High School where he graduated in 1964. Modrich is of Croatian, Montenegrin, German and Scottish (Gaelic) origin. His paternal grandfather, of Croatian descent, is probably from the small village of Modrići near Zadar, and grandmother of Montenegrin descent, both immigrated to the United States from coastal Croatia in the late 19th century. His maternal family is of mixed German and Scotch-Irish descent. Modrich married fellow scientist Vickers Burdett in 1980.

Modrich obtained a B.S. degree from the Massachusetts Institute of Technology in 1968 and subsequently a Ph.D. degree from Stanford University in 1973. He continued his research as a postdoc in the lab of Charles C. Richardson at Harvard Medical School for a year (1973–1974).

== Research ==
Modrich became an assistant professor at the chemistry department of University of California, Berkeley in 1974. He joined Duke University's faculty in 1976 and has been a Howard Hughes Investigator since 1995. He works primarily on strand-directed mismatch repair. His lab demonstrated how DNA mismatch repair serves as a copyeditor to prevent errors from DNA polymerase. Matthew Meselson previously proposed the existence of recognition of mismatches. Modrich performed biochemical experiments to study mismatch repair in E. coli. They later searched for proteins associated with mismatch repair in humans.

== Honors and awards ==
Honors and awards received by Modrich include:

- 1983: Pfizer Award in Enzyme Chemistry
- 1996: General Motors Charles S. Mott Prize in Cancer Research
- 1998: Robert J. and Claire Pasarow Foundation Medical Research Award for cancer research
- 2000 Feodor Lynen Medal
- 2005: American Cancer Society Medal of Honor
- 2015: Nobel Prize in Chemistry
- 2016: Arthur Kornberg and Paul Berg Lifetime Achievement Award in Biomedical Sciences

Modrich is a fellow of the American Academy of Arts and Sciences and a member of the National Academy of Medicine and the National Academy of Sciences.
