= Protected designation of origin =

Geographical indication of food origin

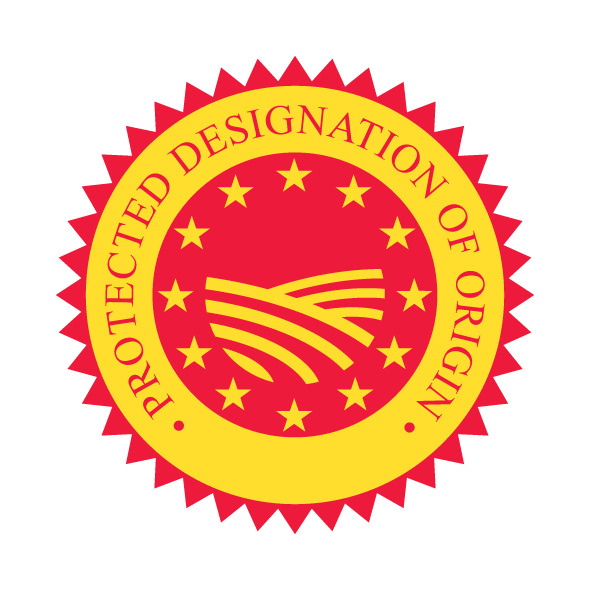
EU protected designation of origin logo

The protected designation of origin (PDO) is a type of geographical indication of the European Union aimed at preserving the designations of origin of food-related products. The designation was created in 1992 and its main purpose is to designate products that have been produced, processed and developed in a specific geographical area, using the recognized know-how of local producers and ingredients from the region concerned.

== Features ==
The characteristics of the products protected are essentially linked to their terroir. The European or UK PDO logo, of which the use is compulsory, documents this link. European Regulation 510/2006 of 20 March 2006 acknowledges a priority to establish a community protection system that ensures equal conditions of competition between producers. This European Regulation is intended to guarantee the reputation of regional products, adapt existing national protections to make them comply with the requirements of the World Trade Organization, and inform consumers that products bearing the protected designation of origin logo comply with the conditions of production and origin specified by the designation. The Regulation applies to certain agricultural products and foods for which there is a link between the characteristics of the product or the food and its geographical origin: they may be wines, cheeses, hams, sausages, olives, beers, fruits, vegetables, breads or animal feed.

Foods such as Parmigiano Reggiano, Gorgonzola, Asiago cheese, Camembert de Normandie, and Champagne can be labeled as such only if they come from the designated region. For example, to be marketed under the Roquefort designation of origin, a cheese must be processed from raw milk from a certain breed of sheep (Lacaune), the animals must be raised in a specific territory and the cheese obtained must be refined in one of the cellars at Roquefort-sur-Soulzon in the French department of Aveyron, where it must be seeded with mold spores (Penicillium roqueforti) prepared from traditional strains endemic to these same cellars.

== PDO in different languages ==
The PDO logo is available in all languages of the European Union and companies are free to use the logo and abbreviation of any of the versions. Examples of different language versions are shown below:

PDO in different language versions
Language	Name	Abbreviation
Bulgarian	Защитено наименование за произход	ЗНП
Croatian	Zaštićena oznaka izvornosti	ZOI
Czech	Chráněné označení původu	ChOP
Danish	Beskyttet oprindelsesbetegnelse	BOB
Dutch	Beschermde Oorsprongsbenaming	BOB
Estonian	Kaitstud päritolunimetus	KPN
English	Protected designation of origin	PDO
Finnish	Suojattu alkuperänimitys	SAN
French	Appellation d'origine protégée	AOP
German	geschützte Ursprungsbezeichnung	g. U.
Greek	προστατευόμενη ονομασία προέλευσης	ΠΟΠ
Hungarian	Oltalom alatt álló eredetmegjelölés	OEM
Irish	Bunús Ainmníochta Cosanta	BAC
Italian	Denominazione d'Origine Protetta	DOP
Latvian	Aizsargāts cilmes vietas nosaukums	ACVN
Lithuanian	Saugomos kilmės vietos nuorodos	SKVN
Maltese	Denominazzjoni ta' Oriġini Protetta	DOP
Polish	chroniona nazwa pochodzenia	ChNP
Portuguese	Denominação de Origem Protegida	DOP
Romanian	Denumirea de origine protejată	DOP
Slovak	Chránené označenie pôvodu	CHOP
Slovene	Zaščitena označba porekla	ZOP
Spanish	Denominación de origen protegida	DOP
Swedish	Skyddad ursprungsbeteckning	SUB
Turkish	Coğrafi işaret tescili	Cİ

== European register ==
The protected names are entered in the European "register of protected designations of origin and protected geographical indications", or "EU Quality Register" for short, which is maintained by the European Commission's Directorate-General for Agriculture and Rural Development. The applications, publications, registrations and any changes are recorded in the DOOR (Database of Origin and Registration) database and can be accessed online by anyone.

Starting on 1 April 2019, the online database eAmbrosia was put into operation by the European Commission, which lists information about protected wines, spirits and food in the European Union and the previous three different databases: E-SPIRIT-DRINKS, DOOR and E -BACCHUS replaced on 31 December 2019.

== See also ==
- AOC – appellation d'origine contrôlée (France)
- AOP – appellation d'origine protégée (Switzerland)
- DOC – denominazione di origine controllata (Italy)
- DOC – denominação de Origem Controlada (Portugal)
- Geographical indications and traditional specialities in the European Union
- List of geographical indications in India
- List of Croatian products with protected designation of origin
- List of Italian products with protected designation of origin
- List of Portuguese food and drink products with protected status
- List of Republic of Ireland food and drink products with protected status
- List of United Kingdom food and drink products with protected status
