= Rogotin Bridge =

Rogotin Bridge Rogotinski most
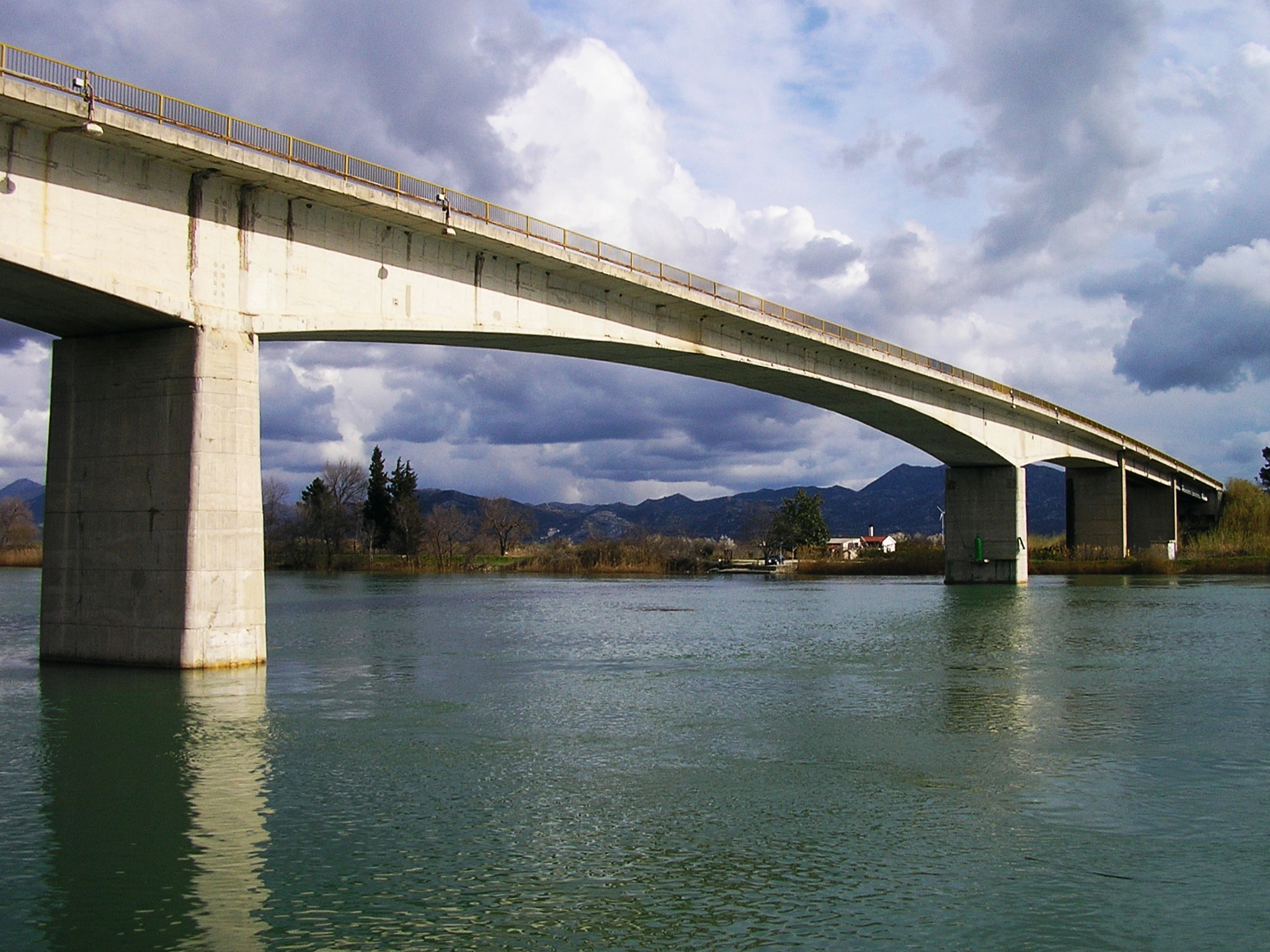
- Coordinates: 43°02′19.2″N 17°29′05.9″E
- Carries: D8 state road
- Crosses: Neretva
- Locale: Rogotin, Dubrovnik-Neretva County, Croatia

Characteristics
- Material: Prestressed concrete
- Total length: 414 m
- Longest span: 110 m

History
- Opened: 1966

Location
- Interactive map of Rogotin Bridge

The Rogotinski Bridge (Croatian: Rogotinski most) is a road bridge that spans the Neretva river in the town of Rogotin near Ploče. It is built from prestressed concrete, and the construction was officially finished in 1966.

A little over a year before construction began, in May 1965, a temporary pontoon bridge, about 160 meters long, was built across the Neretva to serve as a crossing over the river. The central arch, 36 meters wide, was opened as needed so as not to interrupt river traffic between Ploče and Metković.

The opening of the bridge significantly relieved traffic on the old road between Komin and Metković, and especially the bridge in Metković at that time (the predecessor of the current Lučki bridge).
