= Maslenica =

- Village
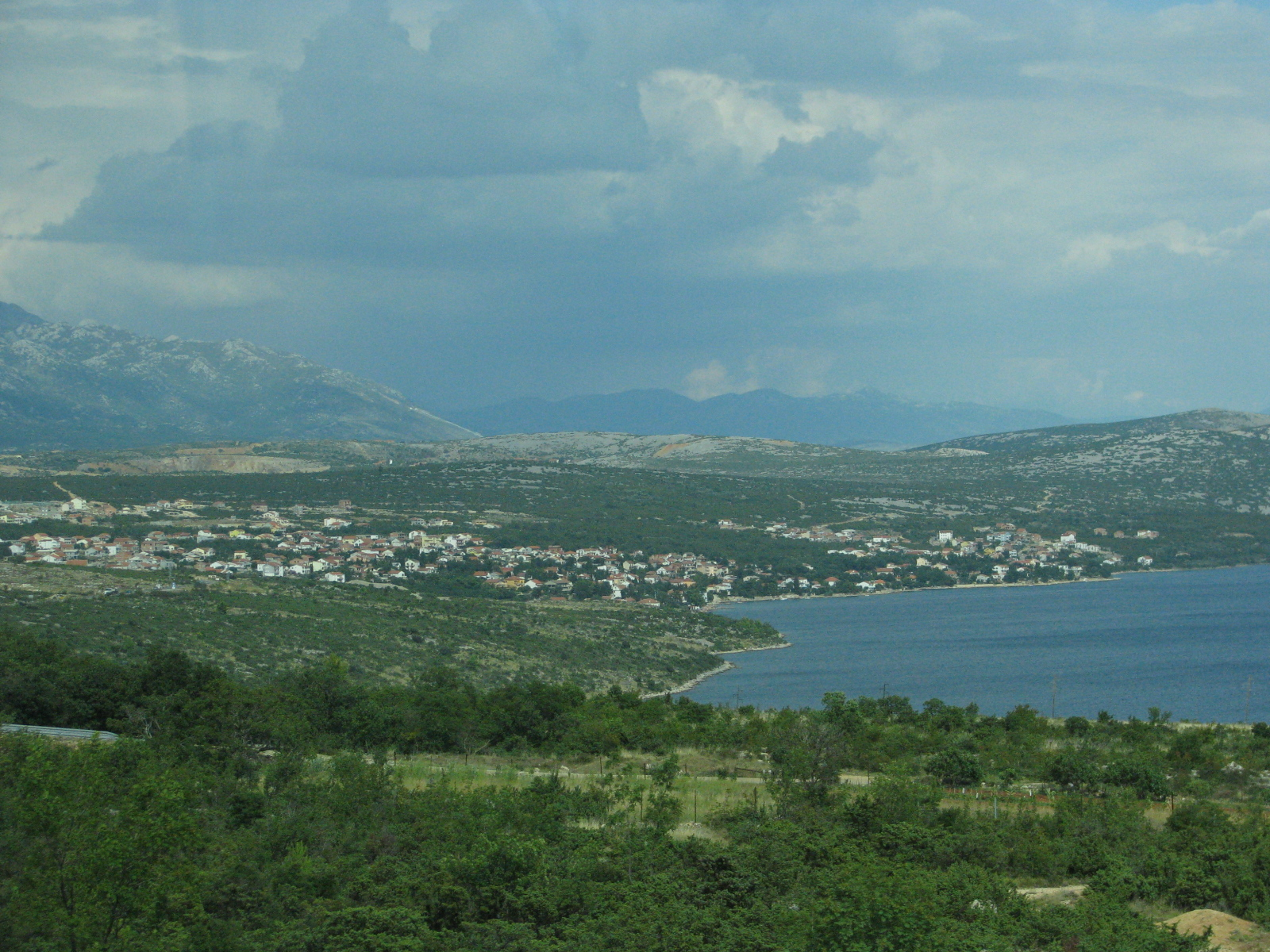
- Interactive map of Maslenica
- Location within Croatia
- Coordinates: 44°13′16″N 15°32′43″E
- Country: Croatia
- Region: Dalmatia
- County: Zadar
- Municipality: Jasenice

Area
  - Total: 6.5 km^{2} (2.5 sq mi)

Population (2021)
  - Total: 800
  - Density: 120/km^{2} (320/sq mi)
- Time zone: UTC+1 (CET)
  - Summer (DST): UTC+2 (CEST)
- Postal code: 23243
- Area code: 023

Maslenica is a village in the municipality of Jasenice in Zadar County, Dalmatia, Croatia. It is situated in Novigrad Sea. Waters are quite clear due to the Zrmanja river which flows into this gulf.

== History ==
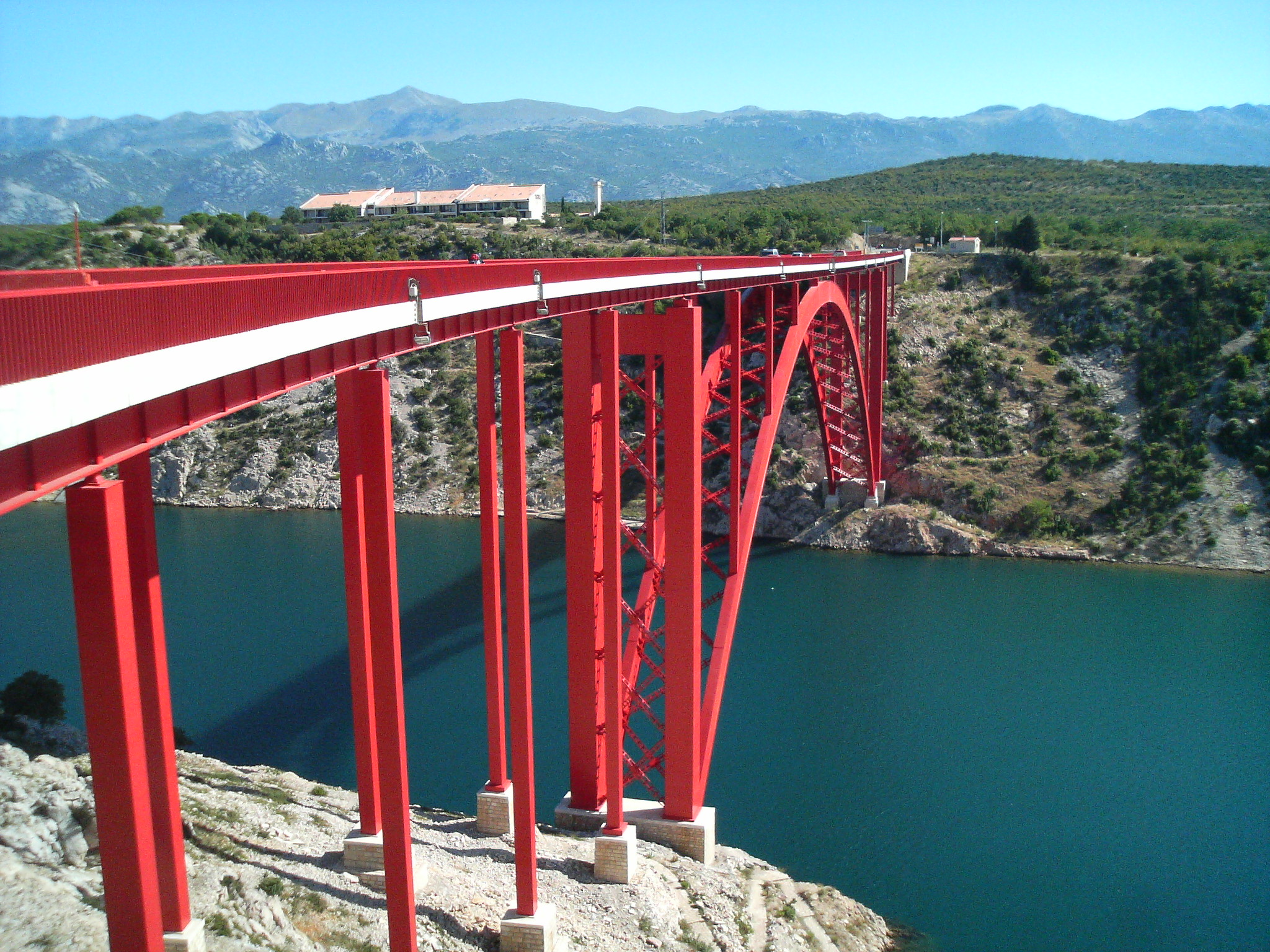
The rebuilt Old Maslenica Bridge.

The village was built 1000 years ago.

Maslenica was damaged under the Croatian War of Independence in the 1990s. Most notably, a heavily traveled bridge, the Maslenica Bridge was destroyed. In 2006, the bridge was rebuilt on the same spot and similar appearance. In the meantime, an additional bridge, also known as Maslenica Bridge had been built slightly north, on the A1 motorway.

Operation Maslenica got its name from the village.
