= Novigrad Sea =

Inland sea in Croatia, part of the Adriatic Sea

- Novigradsko more
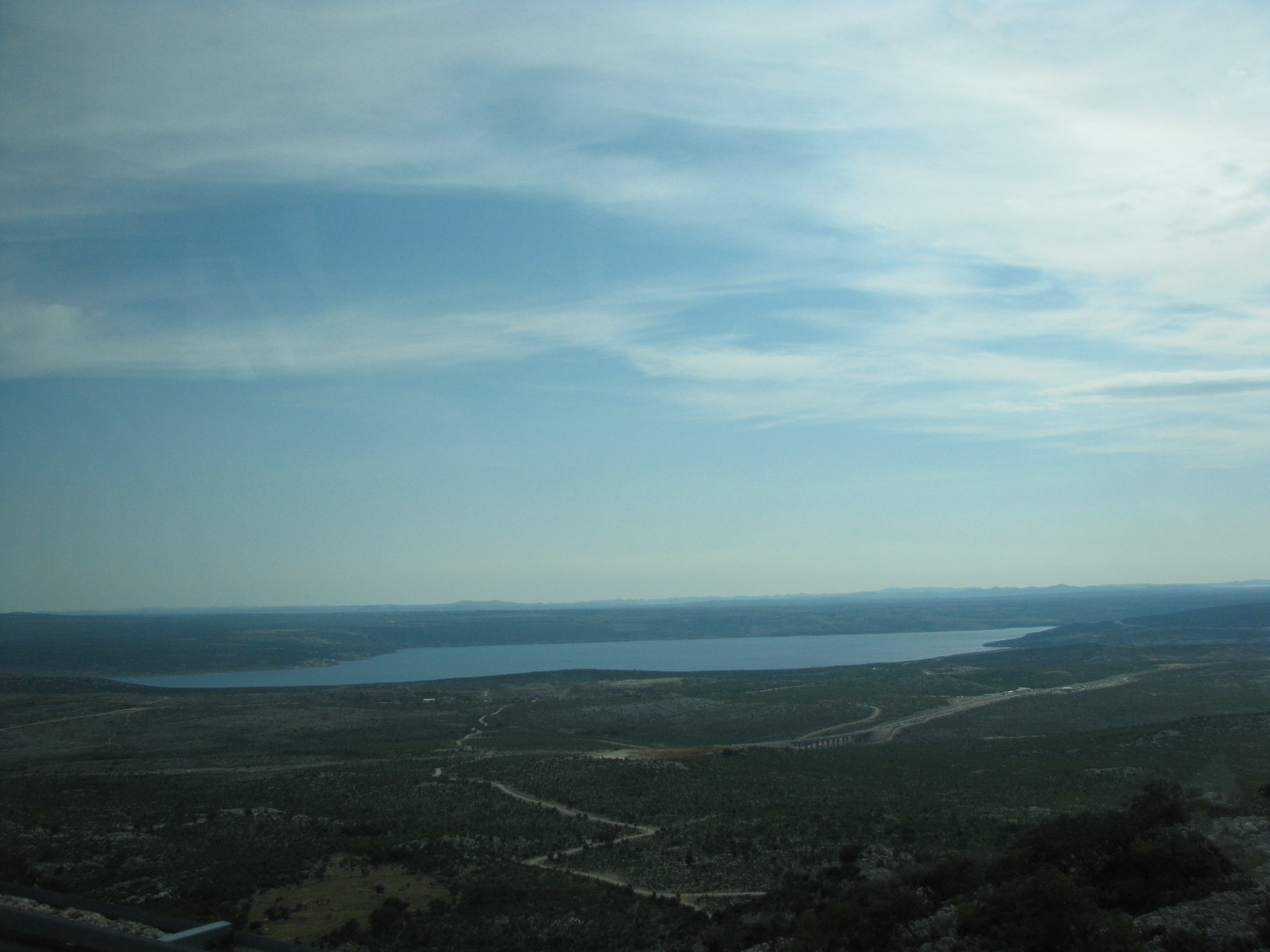
- Interactive map of Novigrad Sea
- Location: Zadar County
- Coordinates: 44.2°N 15.533333°E
- Type: Sea
- Part of: Adriatic Sea
- Primary inflows: Zrmanja
- Basin countries: Croatia
- Max. length: 11 km (6.8 mi)
- Max. width: 4.5 km (2.8 mi)
- Surface area: 28.65 km^{2} (11.06 sq mi)
- Average depth: 28 m (92 ft)
- Max. depth: 37 m (121 ft)
- Shore length^{1}: 29.7 km (18.5 mi)
- ^{1} Shore length is not a well-defined measure.

Novigrad Sea., or Novegradi Sea, or Novigradi Sea (in Croatian Novigradsko more) is an inland sea at the end of the Velebit Channel, in northern Dalmatia, Croatia. It is located east of the city of Zadar.

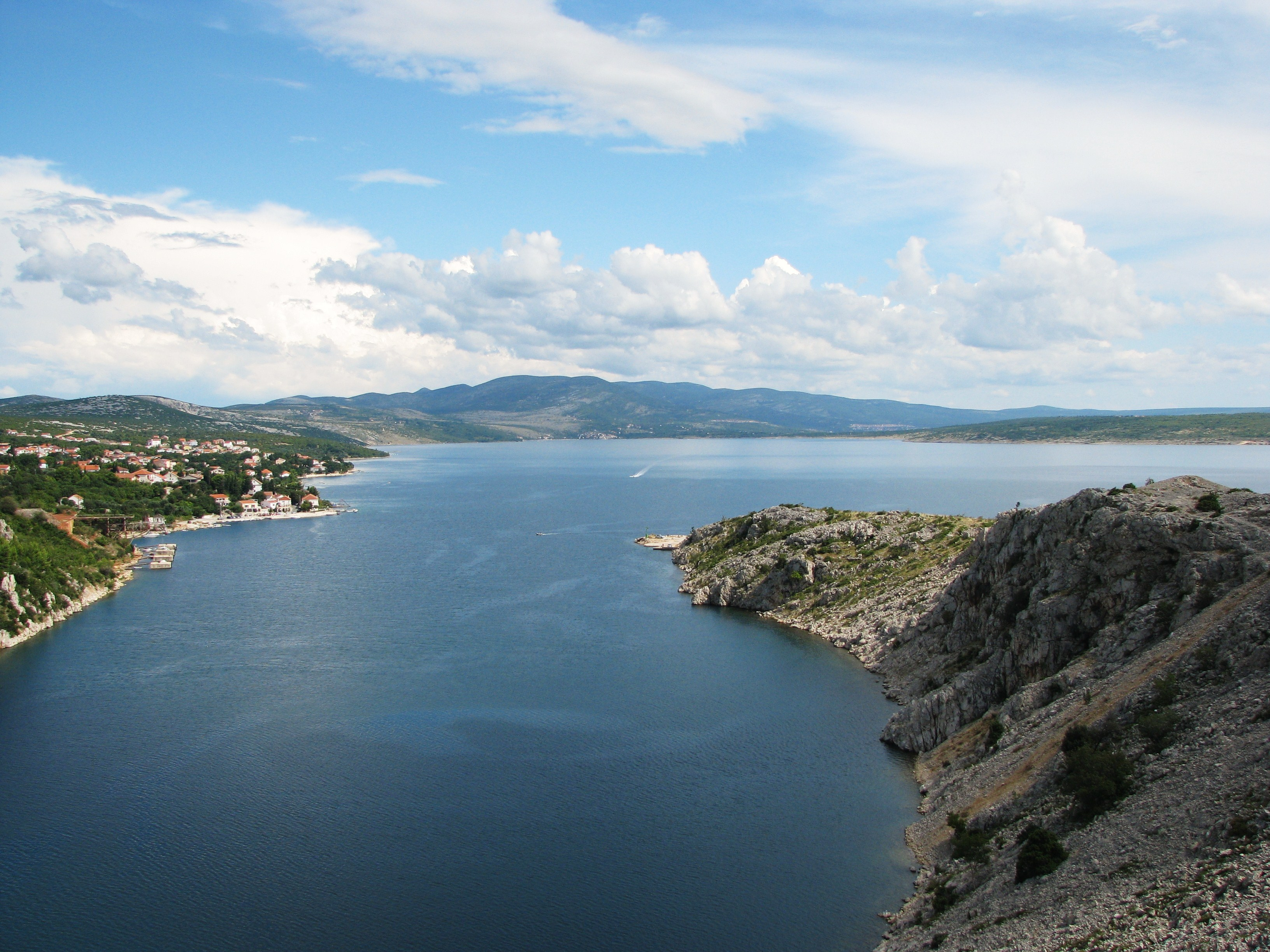
View of the Novegradi Sea from the Novsko Ždrilo channel.

== Geography ==
At the end of the Velebit Channel one enters the Novegradi Sea through the narrow Novsko Ždrilo channel, which opens in front of the village of Maslenica (Maslenica). The other villages overlooking the shores of the bay are Posedarje to the northwest; Novigrad to the south; and Meka Draga to the southeast; while the territory of the bay is divided among the municipalities of Posedarje, Jasenice, Novigrad, and Obrovac. The main inflow is the Zrmanja river which, after passing through Obrovac, flows into the eastern part of the bay, while to the west the small Bašćica river (Bašćica) flows in.

The inlet has an area of 28.65 km², measures 11 km by 4.5 km; its average depth is 28 m, with a maximum depth of 37 m. Small bays line the coast: Maslenica Bay (uvala Maslenica), Zališće Bay (uvala Zališće), between Maslenica and the Zrmanja estuary; Dumićina Bay (uvala Dumićina), Pomišalj, and Kozjak, to the southeast, near Mala Draga; the port of Novigrad (luka Novigrad), which extends into the mainland like an inverted S and whose entrance is marked by a small lighthouse; Ladina Bay (uvala Ladina) to the south; Žabokrek Bay south of Posedarje; Donja Draga Bay (Donja draga) and Gornja draga west of Ždrijac Point or Sadrillo (rt Ždrijac) which marks the exit of the Novsko Ždrilo channel and is indicated by a lighthouse

In the southeastern part of the Novegradi Sea, the Karinsko Ždrilo channel or Karin Strait (Karinsko Ždrilo) leads to another inland inlet: the Karin Sea (Karinsko more).

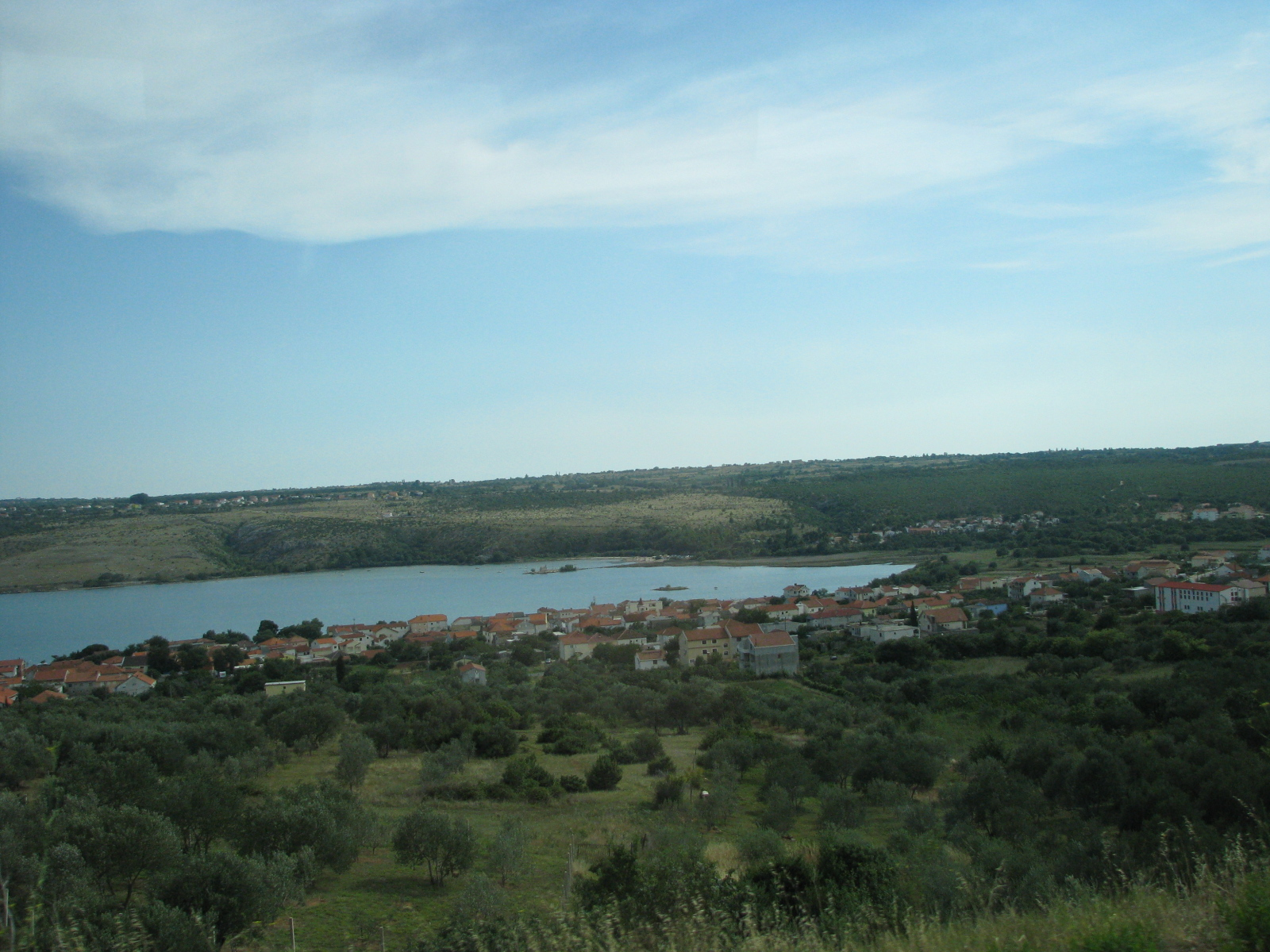
The western part of the bay with Sveti Duh and Mali Školj

=== Islands ===
- Sveti Duh (Sveti Duh), at the western end of the bay.
- Mali Školj (Mali Školj), a rounded islet between Sveti Duh and the port of Posedarje, 130 m away 44°11′31″N 15°28′24″E.
- Veli Školj (Veli Školj), a rounded islet southeast of Posedarje, about 230 m from the coast 44°12′32″N 15°29′07″E.
- Hrid Zališće, southeast of the Novsko Ždrilo channel.
- Hrid Jazina (hrid Jazina), an islet adjacent to the coast near Maslenica, southeast of Ždrijac Point, shown in old maps and now semi-submerged 44°12′54″N 15°33′11″E.
- Hrid Gajina, a small elongated islet adjacent to the southern coast, near Štambača Point, north of Novigrad. It is only 50 m from the coast 44°11′32″N 15°33′27″E.

== Bibliography ==
- Alberi, Dario (2008). Dalmazia. Storia, arte, cultura [Dalmatia. History, Art, Culture] (in Italian). Trebaseleghe (PD): Lint Editoriale. ISBN 978-888-190-244-6.
- Rizzi, Alberto (2010). Guida della Dalmazia [Guide to Dalmatia] (in Italian). Vol. I. Trieste: Italo Svevo. ISBN 978-88-6268-060-8.
- Marieni, Giacomo (1845). i.r. Istituto Geografico Militare (ed.). Portolano del mare Adriatico [Pilot Book of the Adriatic Sea] (in Italian) (2nd ed.). Vienna: Tipografia dei PP. Mechitaristi.

=== Cartography ===
- "Mappa topografica della Croazia 1:25000" (in Croatian).
- Carta di cabottaggio del mare Adriatico [Chart of cabotage of the Adriatic Sea] (in Italian). Vol. sheet VII. Milan: Istituto Geografico Militare. 1822–1824.
