= Maslenica Bridge (D8) =

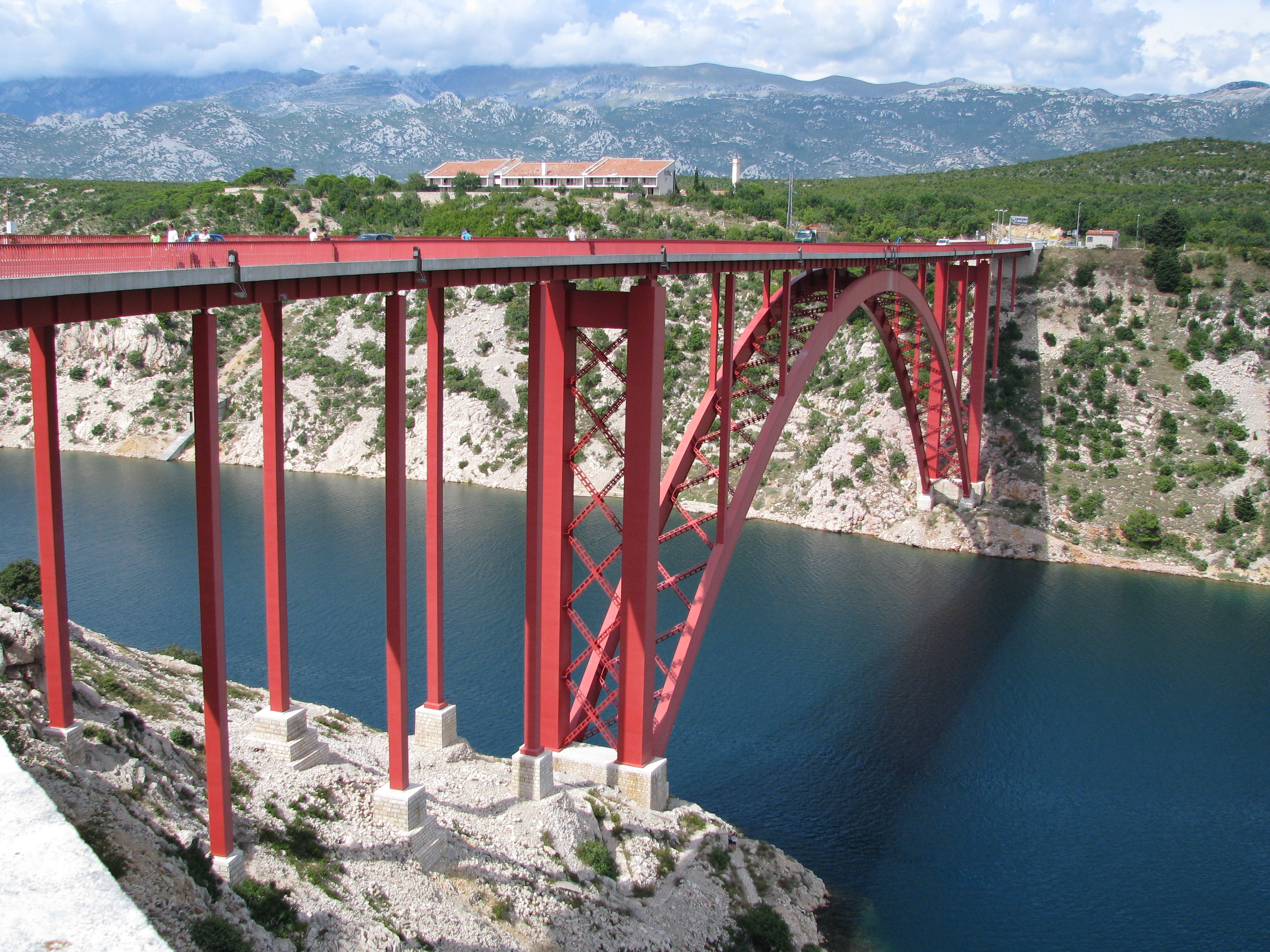
- Coordinates: 44.224838°N 15.531192°E
- Carries: D8 state road
- Locale: Southern Croatia
- Official name: Most Maslenica
- Maintained by: Hrvatske ceste

Characteristics
- Design: deck arch bridge
- Total length: 315.3 m
- Width: 10.5 m
- Longest span: 155 m
- Clearance below: 55 m

History
- Opened: 1961 (original); 2005 (rebuilt)
- Closed: 1991-2005 (destroyed)

Statistics
- Toll: None

Location
- Interactive map of Maslenica Bridge

The Maslenica Bridge (Croatian: Most Maslenica, also known as Croatian: Maslenički most) is a deck arch bridge carrying the D8 state road spanning the Novsko Ždrilo strait of the Adriatic Sea approximately 1 km (0.62 mi) to the west of the settlement of Maslenica, Croatia and 500 m (1,600 ft) south of the D54 and D8 state roads junction. It was built in 2005 on a site of a similar bridge that was destroyed in 1991, during the Croatian War of Independence.

== Structure ==
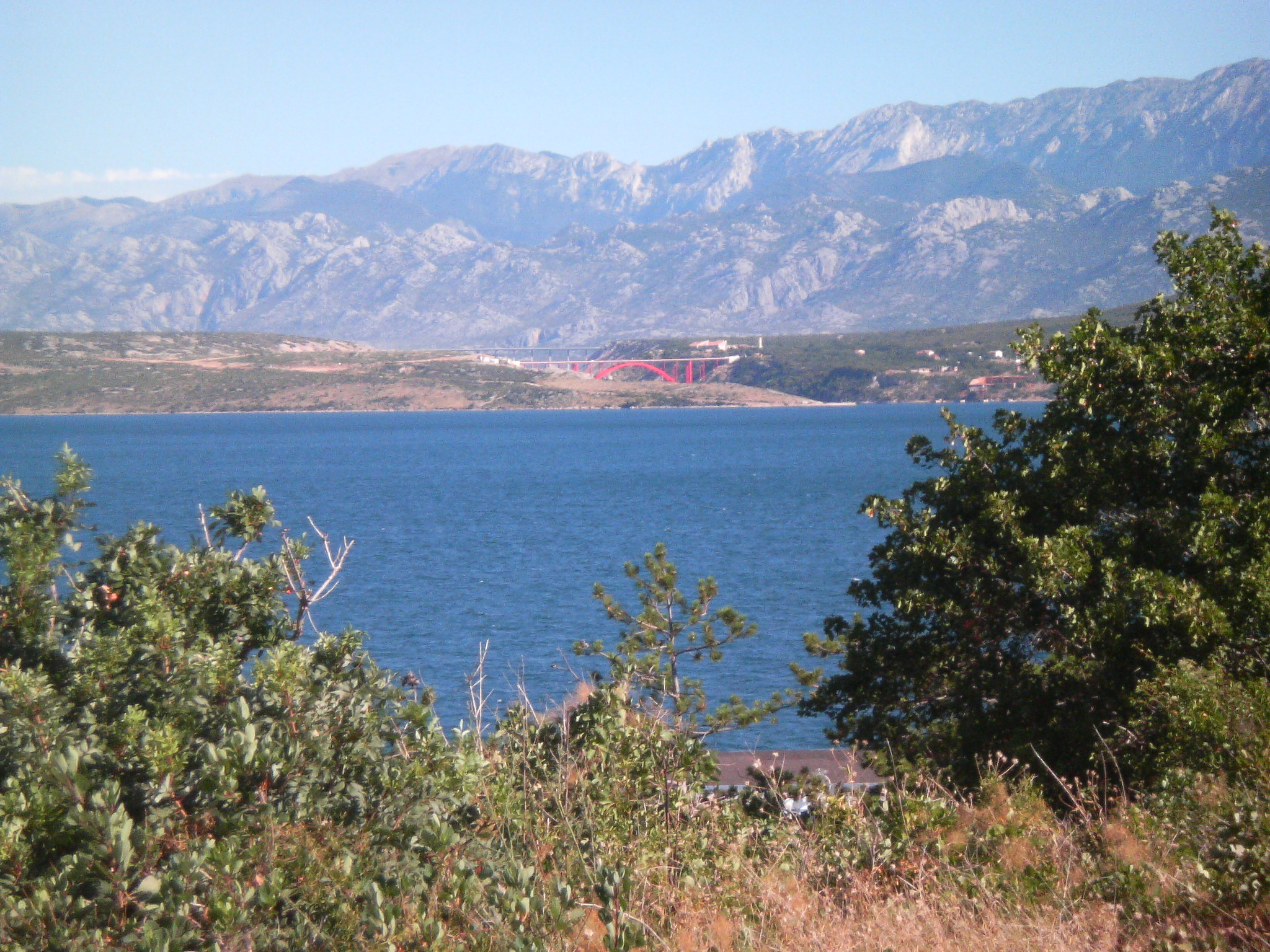
Both Maslenica bridges

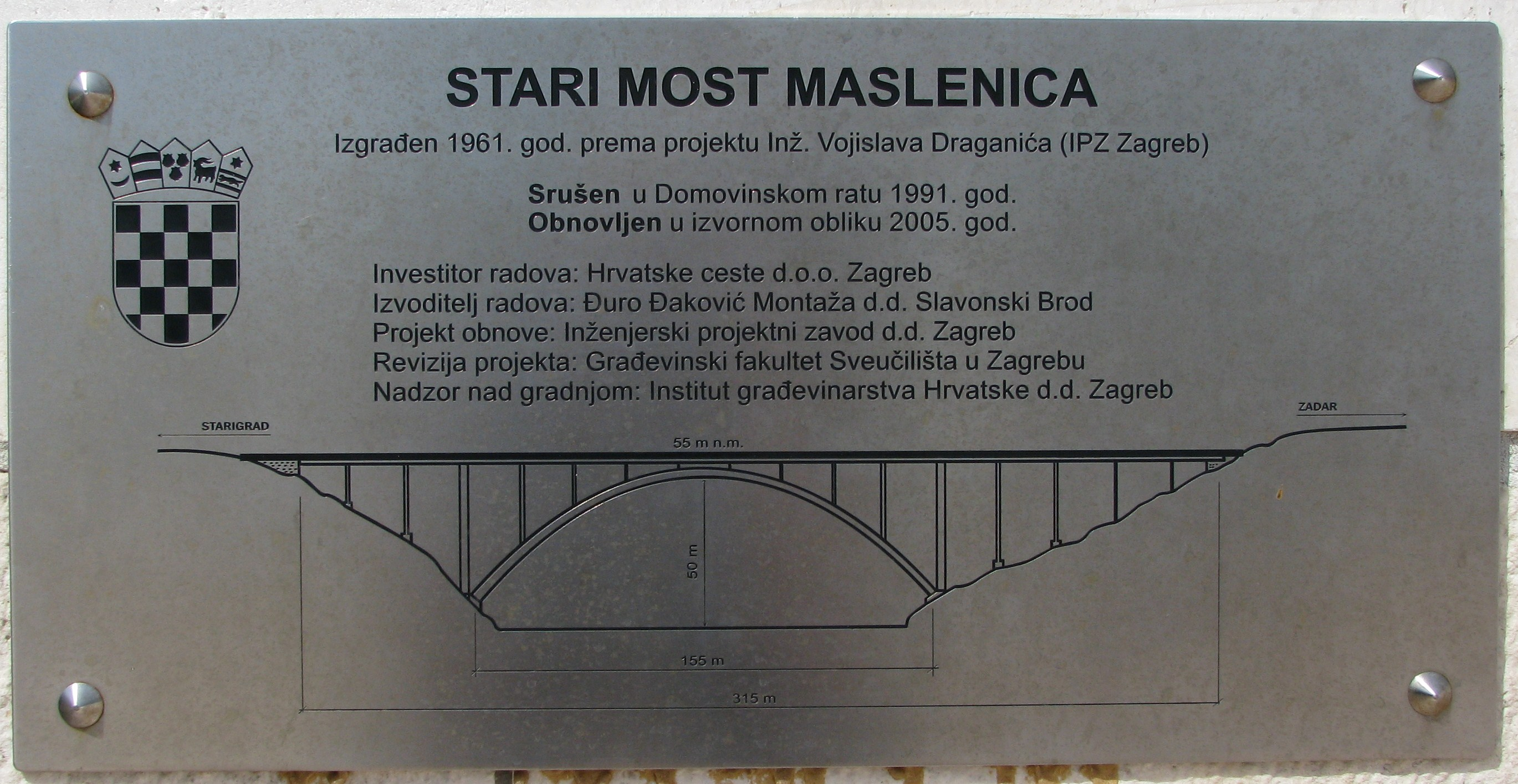
Dedication plaque placed on the bridge

The bridge is 315.3-metre (1,034 ft) long, measured between the abutments, comprising a steel arch supporting a reinforced concrete deck executed as a continuous girder across 17 spans: 17.52 m (57.5 ft) + 2 x 19.71 m (64.7 ft) + 19.68 m (64.6 ft) + 7 x 17.52 m (57.5 ft) + 19.68 m (64.6 ft) + 4 x 19.71 m (64.7 ft) + 17.52 m (57.5 ft). The deck structure comprises a grillage consisting of the deck slab with longitudinal girders and cross-girders. The 0.25 m (9.8 in) thick reinforced concrete deck slab is supported by the cross-girders set 2.19 m (7 ft 2 in) apart and the longitudinal girders set 8 m (26 ft) apart and made composite. The bridge piers and spandrel columns comprise hollow square cross-section. Size of the squares (edge) varies depending on height of the piers and columns from 650 mm to 850 mm, except for the columns at the springing which are 2,300 mm (91 in) wide. The arch spans 155 m (509 ft), with an arch rise of 41.45 metres (136.0 ft). The arch comprises a box cross section and provides a 55 m (180 ft) clearance below the bridge.

== The first Maslenica Bridge ==
The original Maslenica Bridge was designed by Vojislav Draganić of Inženjerski Projektni Zavod (IPZ) between 1955 and 1960. By 1989, wear caused by heavy traffic and inadequate maintenance became significant, including cracks on the cross-girders and a pier. That led to a half-year-long suspension of freight traffic across the bridge while it was repaired. The issues with the spandrel structure and the piers were remediated at that time by strengthening the pier and column cross-sections and by repairs to the cross-girder joints. During the summer of 1990, the bridge was once again in full operation, followed by another period of restricted use while the rehabilitation works were completed.

The bridge was destroyed by explosives on 21 November 1991 during the Croatian War of Independence. Prior to its demolition it represented the last road link between Zagreb and Split left intact within the territory controlled by the government of the Republic of Croatia thereby being of immense importance.

== Pontoon bridge ==
In July 1993, as control of the bridge general area was restored to the Republic of Croatia, a pontoon bridge was completed near the location of destroyed Maslenica Bridge in order to restore the road route linking the Croatian capital and Dalmatia.

The bridge was executed atop barges and served as the only road link between Zagreb and Split (that did not require use of ferries or occupied territories) between 1993 and 1995. The pontoon bridge was repeatedly attacked by artillery causing occasional damage or even sinking of individual barges which were subsequently replaced. After 1995 and conclusion of the Croatian War of Independence the pontoon bridge lost some of its importance as overland routes became available.

== Reconstruction of the Maslenica Bridge ==
In 2003 Hrvatske ceste started tender procedure regarding reconstruction of the Maslenica Bridge in its original form. The remains of the original bridge left over were pier foundations (some of them shifted or damaged) and the southern abutment. The reconstruction design was based on the original construction designs which were still available. All basic structural elements were left unchanged, while some changes were necessary due to changes to construction code implemented since completion of the original bridge. Most significant portion of those applied to earthquake safety. Overall width of the bridge increased from 9.4 m (31 ft) to 10.5 m (34 ft) and the piers and columns are reinforced. Furthermore, roadway grade has changed somewhat and new types of safety railings are placed along the sidewalks. The reconstruction of the Maslenica Bridge was completed and the bridge opened on 17 June 2005.

The construction (or rather reconstruction) costs were 59.8 million Croatian kuna, while removal of the remains of the original bridge required additional 2.2 million kuna. At the opening ceremony it was declared that the reconstructed Maslenica Bridge would also serve as an alternative route to be used during periods of strong wind at the nearby motorway bridge.

The reconstruction works consumed 1,556 tons of concrete, 210 tons of reinforcing steel, and 209 cubic meters of stone cladding.

This bridge offers the highest bungee jumping in Croatia (56 meters).

== Naming confusion ==
As another, reinforced concrete arch bridge, carrying the Croatian A1 motorway, was constructed in 1997 approximately 1.5 km (0.93 mi) away from the site of the original Maslenica Bridge it was given the same name, Maslenica Bridge. Therefore, both bridges are confusingly called both "old" and "new" Maslenica Bridge.

== Traffic volume ==
Traffic on the state roads in Croatia is regularly counted and reported by Hrvatske ceste, operator of the state roads. There is no actual traffic count performed at the Maslenica Bridge itself, however Hrvatske ceste operate a counting station which covers a section of the D8 state road adjacent to the D8 and D54 junction (to the north of the junction). Since the Maslenica Bridge is located only 500 m (1,600 ft) south of the junction, and no other D8 junctions are found between the two, the figure, even though not exact, is highly indicative of the traffic volume carried by the bridge.

Maslenica Bridge traffic volume
| Road | Counting site | AADT | ASDT | Notes |
| D8 | 4803 Seline - south | 2,300 | 5,224 | Adjacent to the D8/D54 junction (to the north). |

== See also ==
- Maslenica Bridge (A1)
- D8 state road
