= Novsko Ždrilo =

Strait in Croatia

- Interactive map of Novsko Ždrilo
- Coordinates: 44°14′04″N 15°31′22″E

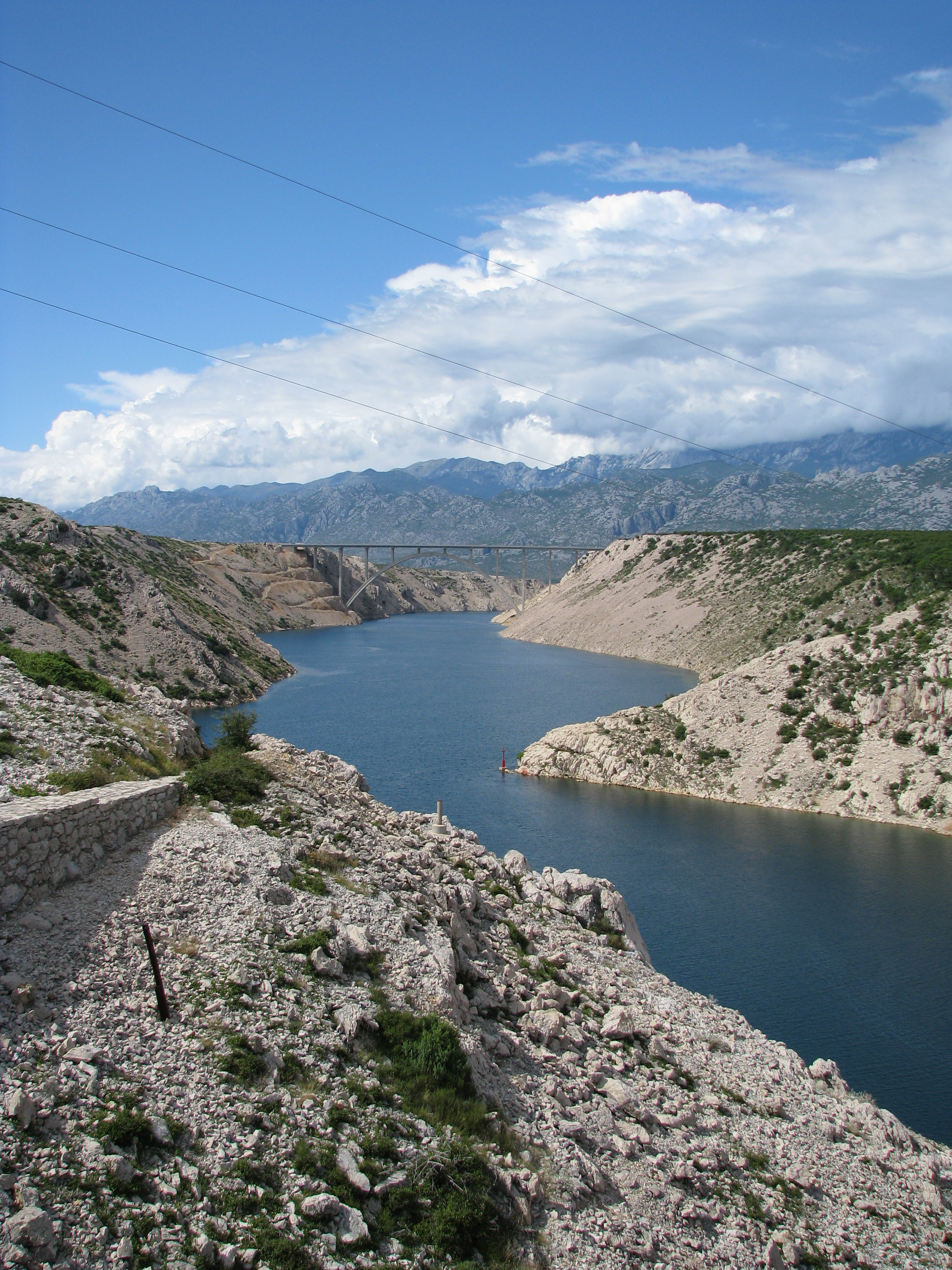
Novsko ždrilo − a view from the Maslenica Bridge (D8) towards the Maslenica Bridge (A1)

Novsko Ždrilo is a strait of the Adriatic Sea in Croatia between the Novigrad Sea (a bay of the Adriatic) and the Velebit Channel. There are two bridges across the strait bearing the same name, Maslenica Bridge.
