= Jasenice, Zadar County =

Jasenice
- Municipality
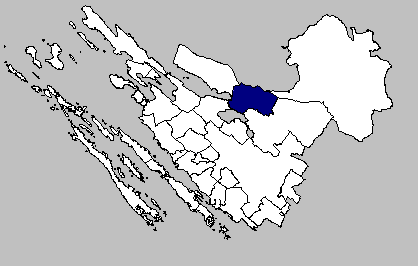
- Jasenice municipality within the Zadar County
- Interactive map of Jasenice
- Location within Croatia
- Coordinates: 44°13′43″N 15°34′38″E
- Country: Croatia
- Region: Dalmatia
- County: Zadar County

Government
  - Municipal Mayor: Stipe Vulić

Area
  - Municipality: 121.6 km^{2} (47.0 sq mi)
  - Urban: 58.1 km^{2} (22.4 sq mi)
- Elevation: 129 m (423 ft)

Population (2021)
  - Municipality: 1,348
  - Density: 11.09/km^{2} (28.71/sq mi)
  - Urban: 151
  - Urban density: 2.60/km^{2} (6.73/sq mi)
- Time zone: UTC+1 (CET)
  - Summer (DST): UTC+2 (CEST)
- Postal code: 23243
- Area code: 023
- Website: jasenice.hr

Jasenice is a village and a municipality in the Zadar County, Croatia.

== Demographics ==
In the 2021 census, there were 1,348 inhabitants in the municipality. The municipality consists of following settlements:

- Jasenice, population 151
- Maslenica, population 800
- Rovanjska, population 302
- Zaton Obrovački, population 95

Before 2014, there were only two settlements in the municipality; Jasenice and Zaton Obrovački. In 2014, the settlement of Jasenice was split into three new ones; Jasenice, Maslenica and Rovanjska.

In the 2011 census, there were 1,398 inhabitants in the municipality, of which 1,272 in Jasenice and 126 in Zaton Obrovački. In the 2001 census, 97% of the population were Croats.

Jasenice: Population trends 1857–2021
v

population	981	1041	1140	1280	1501	1855	1623	1807	1693	1770	1964	2053	1869	1800	1329	1398	1348
	1857	1869	1880	1890	1900	1910	1921	1931	1948	1953	1961	1971	1981	1991	2001	2011	2021

Sources: Croatian Bureau of Statistics publications

== Politics ==
=== Minority councils and representatives ===
Directly elected minority councils and representatives are tasked with consulting tasks for the local or regional authorities in which they are advocating for minority rights and interests, integration into public life and participation in the management of local affairs. At the 2023 Croatian national minorities councils and representatives elections Serbs of Croatia fulfilled legal requirements to elect 10 members minority councils of the Municipality of Jasenice but the elections were not held due to the absence of candidatures.

== Twin towns – sister cities ==
Jasenice is twinned with:

- Greve in Chianti, Italy
