= Rogotin =

- Village
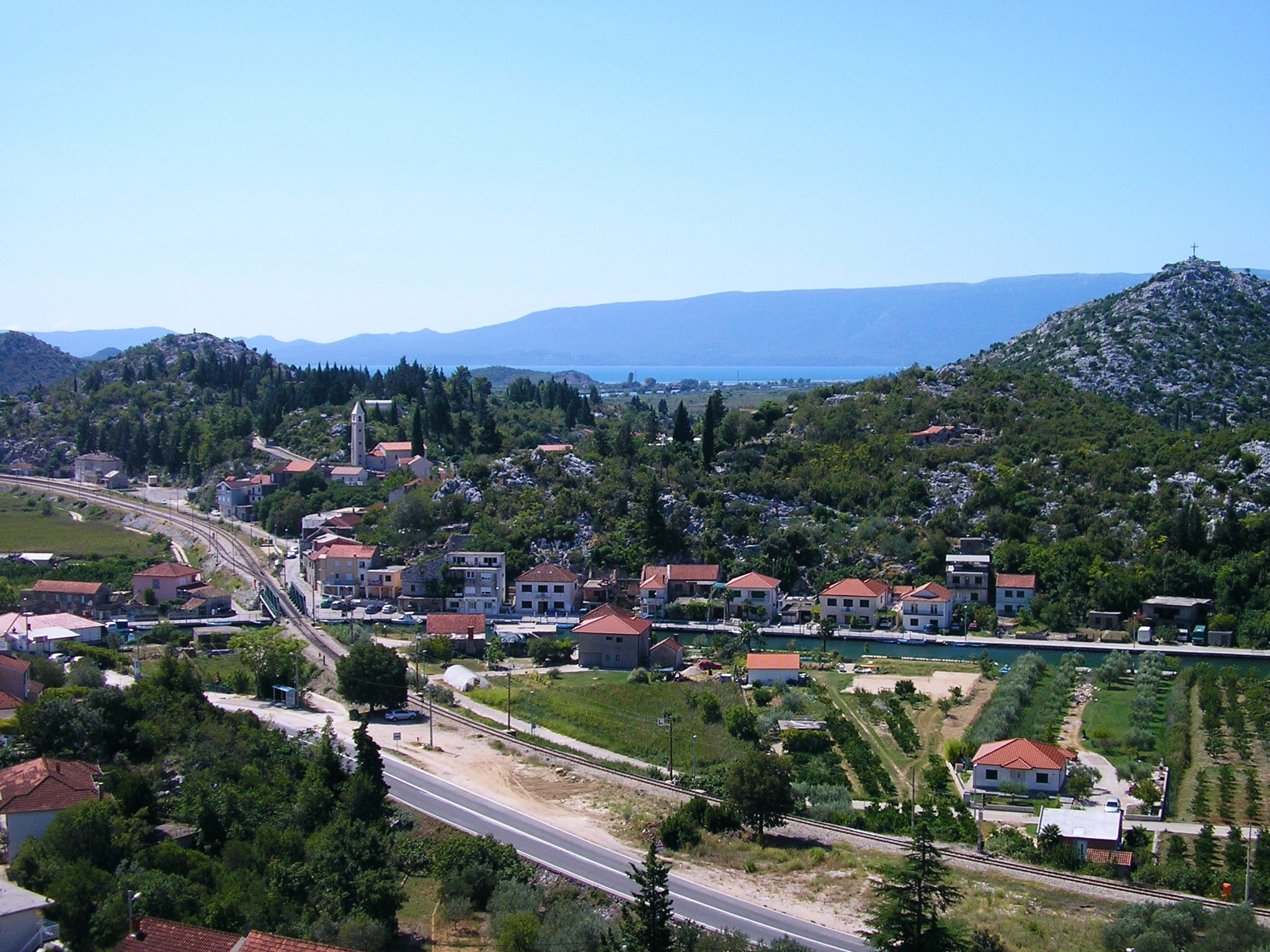

- Location within Croatia
- Coordinates: 43°2′53″N 17°28′1″E
- Country: Croatia
- County: Dubrovnik-Neretva County
- Municipality: Ploče

Area
  - Total: 1.7 sq mi (4.3 km^{2})

Population (2021)
  - Total: 574
  - Density: 350/sq mi (130/km^{2})
- Time zone: UTC+1 (CET)
  - Summer (DST): UTC+2 (CEST)

Rogotin is a village in southern Dalmatia, Croatia, located between Ploče and Metković.

It is administratively part of the town of Ploče.

Rogotin was inhabited in 1716.

Most of the inhabitants were directed to agriculture and fishing.

In 1894. elementary school was opened in Rogotin.

Church of Holy Trinity was built in 1870.

== Demographics ==
According to the 2021 census, its population was 574. It was 665 in 2011.
