= Maslenica Bridge (A1) =

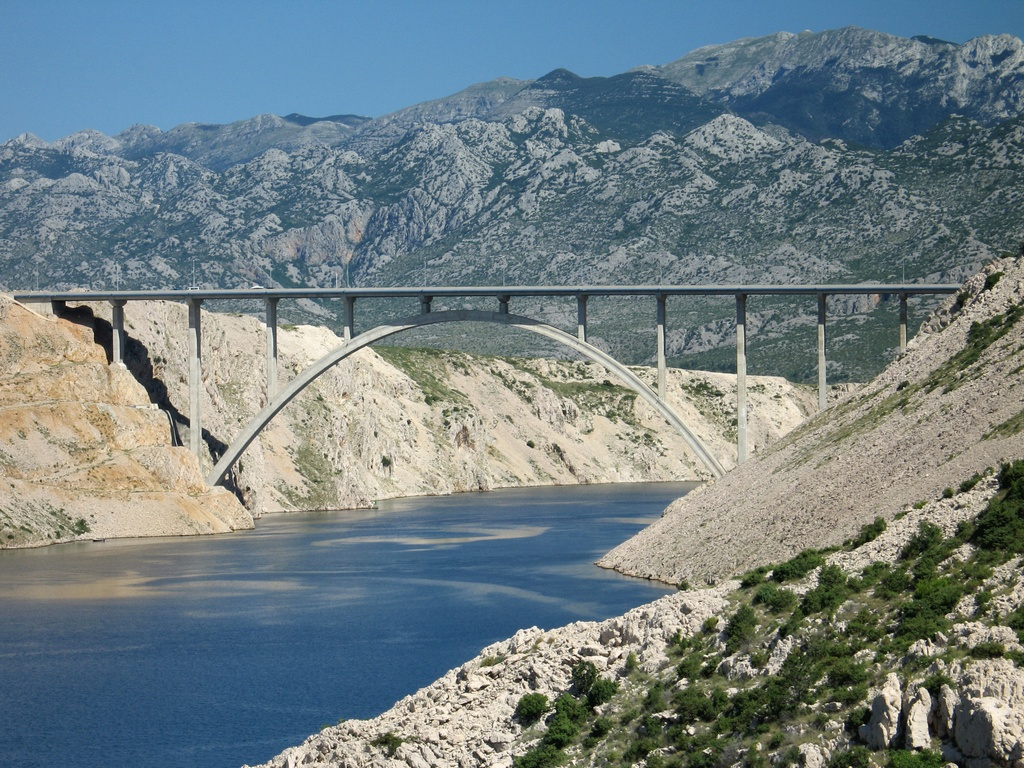
- Coordinates: 44°14′12″N 15°31′20″E
- Carries: A1 motorway
- Crosses: Maslenica Strait (Adriatic Sea)
- Locale: Southern Croatia
- Official name: Most Maslenica
- Maintained by: Croatian Motorways Ltd

Characteristics
- Design: concrete arch bridge
- Total length: 377.6 m
- Width: 20.4 m
- Longest span: 200 m
- Clearance below: 65 m

History
- Opened: 1997

Statistics
- Toll: charged as a part of A1 motorway toll

Location
- Interactive map of Maslenica Bridge

Maslenica Bridge (Croatian: Most Maslenica, but also known as Croatian: Maslenički most) is a 377.6 m (1,239 ft) long reinforced concrete arch bridge spanning the Novsko Ždrilo strait of the Adriatic Sea, north of Zadar, Croatia, carrying the Croatian A1 motorway. It is located between the Rovanjske and Posedarje interchanges of the A1 motorway.

The bridge comprises a 200-metre (660 ft) span reinforced concrete arch, with an arch rise of 65 metres (213 ft). The arch comprises a box cross section, a double cell of constant depth. The superstructure is continuous across 12 spans, consisting of prestressed girders made monolithic with the in situ cast deck slab and transverse girders.

The bridge is maintained and operated by Croatian Motorways Ltd.

Approximately 1.5 km (0.93 mi) to the south, there is another bridge, carrying D8 state road across the same strait, and this was the original crossing point over the strait. Although that is a completely different structure, carrying a different road, that bridge is also officially called Maslenica Bridge. The bridge carrying the A1 motorway is actually older than the one carrying the D8 road, however since the latter is a replacement for a bridge destroyed in the Croatian War of Independence in 1991, both A1 and D8 bridges are known to be referred to as both old and new Maslenica Bridge.

== Construction ==
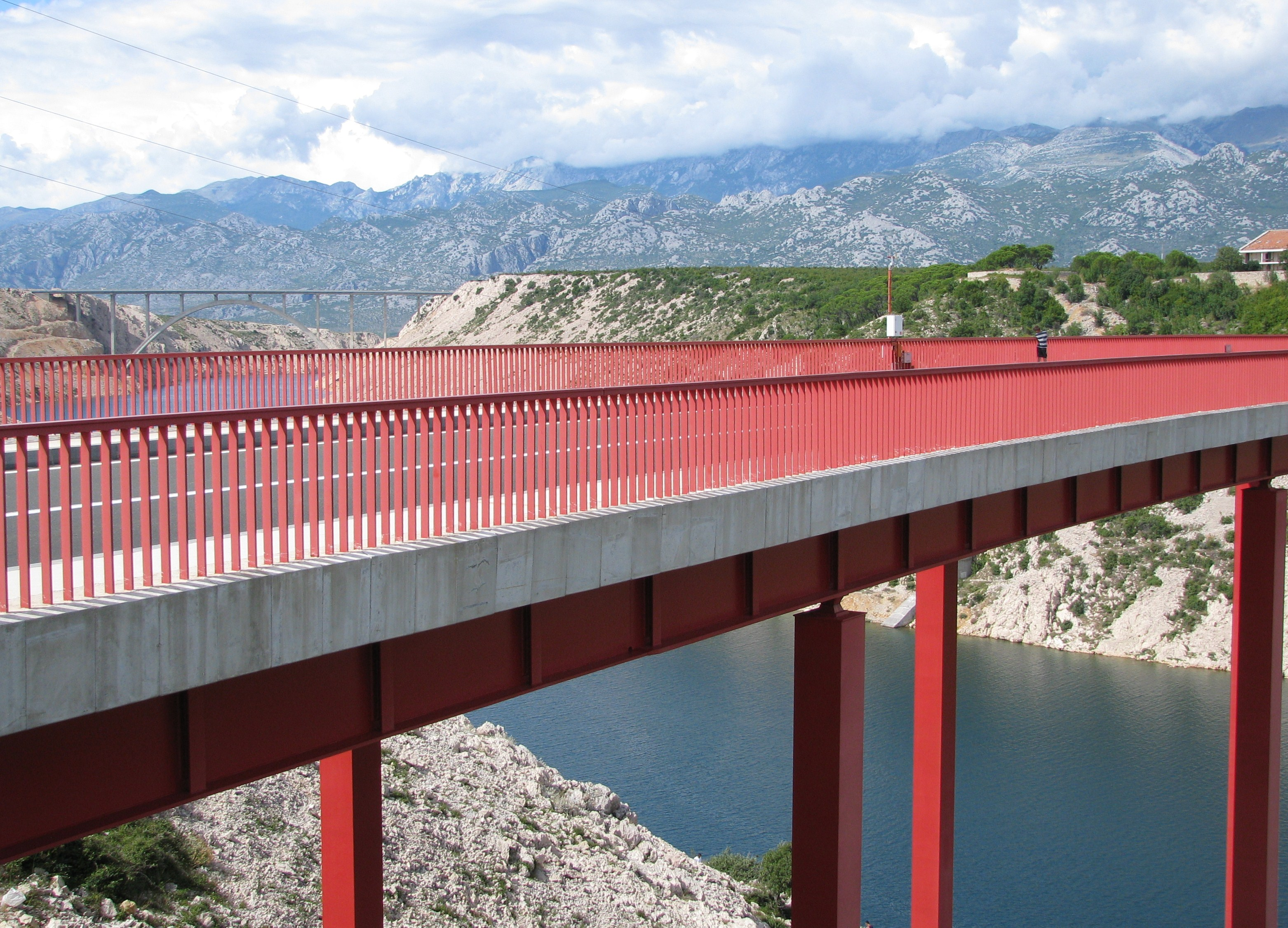
Both Maslenica bridges (The bridge carrying the A1 motorway is visible in the background)

The bridge was designed by Jure Radić, and built by Konstruktor, Split, between 1993 and 1996, using free cantilevering with temporary cable-stays. The reinforced-concrete arch was executed in 5 m (16 ft) long segments, matching spandrel column spacing. Prefabricated girders required for the structure were executed and prestressed in a purpose built plant on the site. The same plant was subsequently used to produce Jersey barriers used as bridge protective barriers.

The bridge is significant as it is the first motorway reinforced-concrete arch bridge comprising a substantial span executed in Croatia.

On 21 December 1998 the speed of a gust of wind on the Maslenica Bridge was measured at a record speed of 248 kilometres per hour.

Subsequently wind protection structures have been executed along the motorway section comprising the Maslenica Bridge, since the 15 km (9.3 mi) long section was completely closed to traffic due to strong wind from time to time - for a total of 6 days and 19 hours in 2007, and 13 days and 2 hours in 2006.

== Traffic volume ==
Traffic is regularly counted and reported by Hrvatske autoceste, operator of the bridge and the A1 motorway where the bridge is located, and published by Hrvatske ceste. Substantial variations between annual (AADT) and summer (ASDT) traffic volumes are attributed to the fact that the bridge carries substantial tourist traffic to the Dalmatian Adriatic resorts. The traffic count is performed using analysis of motorway toll ticket sales.

Maslenica Bridge traffic volume
Road	Counting site	AADT	ASDT	Notes
A1	4805 Maslenica south	12,677	32,411	Between Rovanjske and Posedarje interchanges.

== See also ==
- List of arch bridges by length
- List of bridges by length
