= Highways in Croatia =

Aspect of transport in Croatia

Map of the Croatian motorway network in 2025

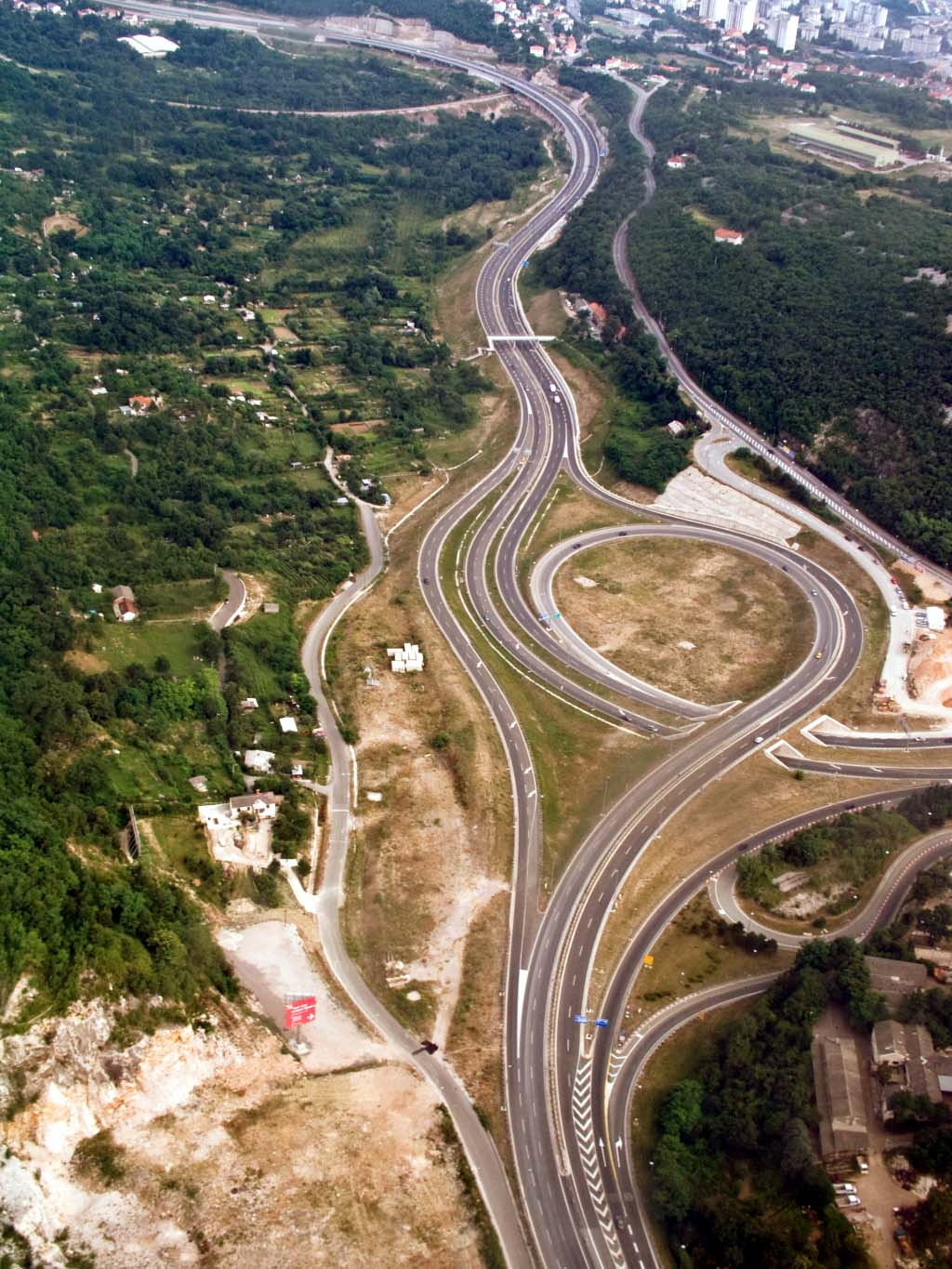
A6 interchange in Orehovica near Rijeka

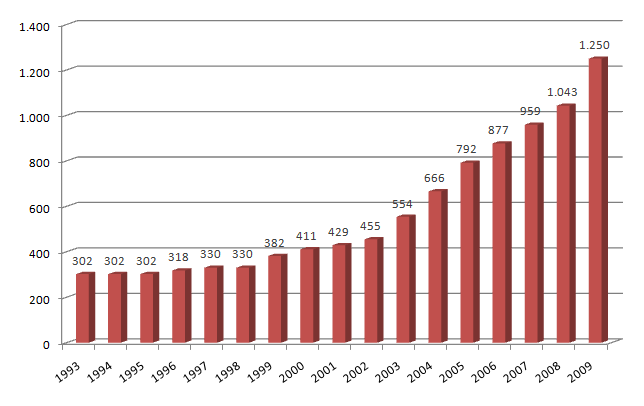
Dynamics of the development of the Croatian motorway network: the length of the motorway network in Croatia 1993-2009

Highways in Croatia are the main transport network in Croatia. The Croatian classification includes several categories of highways:

- The main motorway routes are prefixed with an A (for autocesta) followed by one or two digits. They are controlled-access highways with tolls using a ticket system.
- Expressways (brza cesta) are toll-free limited-access highways with grade-separated intersections and fast speed limits. They are similar to the motorways, but are not always dual carriageways and may have no emergency lanes. Their speed limit is always lower than that of the motorways. They either have standalone designations or are parts of non-motorway state routes, such as the D prefixed highways described further below.
- Roads dedicated for motor vehicles (cesta namijenjena isključivo za promet motornih vozila), which is another category of limited-access highways. They usually have multiple lanes and separated carriageways but may have at-grade intersections. This class of roads has no specific numbering convention, only a dedicated traffic sign. State routes (D roads) or portions thereof may be designated in this manner. An example is Jadranska Avenue in Zagreb, designated as Ž1040, a county road.

Other than the motorway routes, the national road classification includes the following enumerated categories of routes in the national highway system, with decreasing order of priority:

- State roads, which are marked by letter D (državna cesta) and a single, double or triple digit number.
- County roads always are marked by letter Ž (županijska cesta) and a four digit number.
- The lowest classification comprises local roads, marked by letter L (lokalna cesta) and a five digit number.

Road operators differ according to the classification system: The designated motorways are operated by three different concessionaires. The state roads are maintained almost exclusively by Hrvatske ceste, while the county and local roads are managed by various county authorities. The road maintenance agencies are governed by various laws issued by the Parliament as well as bylaws issued by the Ministry of Transport.

== Motorways ==
Autoceste are marked with this sign in Croatia

The primary high-speed motorways are called autoceste (Croatian pronunciation: [ˈautot͡sesta] singular: autocesta), and they are defined as roads with at least three lanes in each direction (including hard shoulder) and a speed limit of not less than 80 kilometres per hour (50 mph). They are marked with a special road sign, similar to the road sign depicting a motorway/autoroute/autobahn in other parts of Europe. The Croatian motorway (autocesta) network is 1,360.5 kilometres (845.4 mi) long.

Motorways in Croatia are defined by the Ministry of Maritime Affairs, Transport and Infrastructure. The same applies to names of the motorway interchanges and rest areas.

== History ==
A major reason for the motorway construction "mania" of the 2000s is a previous political halt of the major Croatian highway project, today's A1, in the 1970s and 1980s under former Yugoslavia. When Croatia declared independence in 1991, the only true motorways in the country were Rijeka–Kikovica (the westernmost part of today's A6), Zagreb–Karlovac (the northernmost part of today's A1) and Zagreb–Slavonski Brod (the central part of today's A3), the latter being part of the Brotherhood and Unity Highway. The dream to connect the two largest Croatian cities Zagreb and Split with a motorway (autocesta) went back to the times of the Croatian Spring, but construction of this project was never realized in the Yugoslav period.

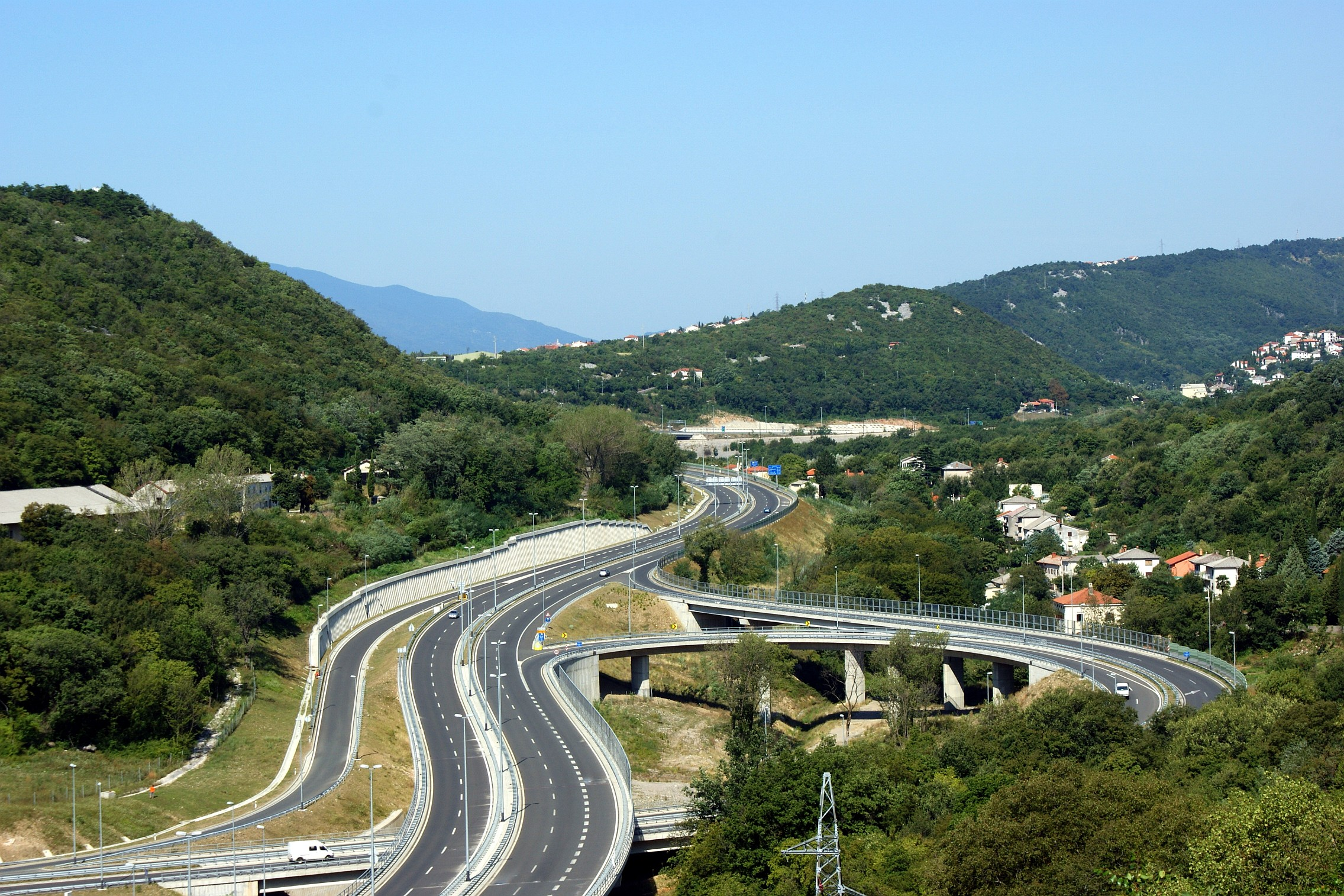
A7 motorway, Croatian motorway network was largely built in the 2000s

In 2005, the Zagreb–Split route was constructed. In addition, the A1 was extended towards Dubrovnik (currently at Ploče), and the A3 was extended so it connects Zagreb to Croatian borders with both Serbia (near Lipovac) and Slovenia (near Bregana). There is also a motorway from Zagreb to Rijeka, the A6, as well as the A4 motorway from Zagreb to the northeast (Hungarian border) as well as the A2 motorway from Zagreb to the northwest (Slovenian border). The A9 between Pula and the Slovenian border is also largely completed.

The construction of additional motorways has noticeably slowed in the 2010s, but it continues. As of 2021, the Cerovlje–Rijeka section of A8, the remaining part of the Istrian Y, is being upgraded from semi-highway status. The other motorways are in various early stages of development, coming up to a total of 11 motorway routes. The A1 is considered unfinished as it is planned to be extended from Ploče to Dubrovnik.

== Operators ==
The network is managed by 3 operators, of which one is under full government control and other two are operated by joint ventures.

Operator	Ownership	Motorway	Length (in 2025)	Notes
BINA Istra	BINA Fincom (67%); Bouygues (16%); Hrvatske autoceste (14.8%); Istarska autocesta (2.2%)	A8, A9	141.0 km (87.6 mi)	Under concession until 2041.
Autocesta Zagreb – Macelj	Pyhrn Concession Holding GmbH (51%); Republic of Croatia (49%)	A2	60.0 km (37.3 mi)	Under concession until 2032.
Hrvatske autoceste	Republic of Croatia (100%)	A1, A3, A4, A5, A6, A7, A10, A11, Krk bridge	1,159.5 km (720.5 mi)	A6 and A7 were operated by Autocesta Rijeka – Zagreb until 31 December 2020.

== Motorways and sections ==
=== List of motorways ===
Motorway	Route	Length (in 2025)	Description	Notes
A1	Zagreb - Split - Dubrovnik	484.1 km (300.8 mi)	The A1 starts in Lučko interchange, a part of Zagreb bypass where the A3 motorway junction is located. The motorway proceeds south from Zagreb to Karlovac and further on to Bosiljevo 2 interchange where the A6 motorway branches off towards Rijeka. The route continues south to Gospić, Zadar, Šibenik, Split. The southernmost sector of the motorway proceeds from Split to Ploče and Metković.	Section between Ploče and Dubrovnik is planned
A2	Zagreb - Macelj	62.3 km (38.7 mi)	The A2 starts on the border with Slovenia near Macelj. The motorway passes west of Krapina and proceeds south towards Zagreb. The southernmost section of the motorway forms a part of Zagreb bypass and it terminates at Jankomir interchange with the A3 motorway.	
A3	Bregana - Zagreb - Lipovac	305.5 km (189.8 mi)	The A3 starts on the border of Slovenia near Bregana. The motorway passes north of Samobor and proceeds west towards Zagreb, passing to the south of the city and forming a part of Zagreb bypass, where the route contains junctions with the A2, A1 and A4 motorways. It continues east to Kutina, Slavonski Brod, Sredanci interchange with the A5 motorway and further east to Županja and terminating on the border of Serbia near Lipovac.	
A4	Zagreb - Goričan	97.7 km (60.7 mi)	The A4 starts on the border of Hungary near Goričan. The motorway passes near Čakovec and Varaždin south towards Zagreb and the southernmost part of the route is a part of Zagreb bypass, where the motorway terminates in Ivanja Reka interchange, where the traffic defaults to the westbound A3 motorway.	
A5	Beli Manastir - Osijek - Bosnian border	88.2 km (54.8 mi)	The A5 starts on the border of Hungary near Beli Manastir and proceeds south bypassing Osijek and Đakovo, meets the A3 motorway at Zoljani interchange and proceeds south to Svilaj border bridge where it connects on Bosnian A1 motorway.	
A6	Rijeka - Bosiljevo 2	81.5 km (50.6 mi)	The A6 starts in Bosiljevo 2 interchange, branching off from the A1 motorway and proceeds west bypassing Delnice to Rijeka and the Orehovica interchange with the A7 motorway.	
A7	Rupa - Rijeka - Žuta Lokva	49 km (30 mi)	The A7 starts at the border of Slovenia and heads south to Rijeka, passes the city as Rijeka bypass. The Rijeka bypass section comprises an interchange with the A6 motorway and proceeds east terminating near Šmrika where the traffic defaults to the D8 state road.	Section east of Rijeka is under construction.
A8	Kanfanar - Matulji	65.8 km (40.9 mi)	The A8 spans between Kanfanar and Matulji, i.e. the A9 and A7 motorways. As of September 2024, the Kanfanar–Vranja section is brought to the motorway standards, with new tube of Učka tunnel opened and the rest is a limited access two-lane route.	
A9	Umag - Pula	76.8 km (47.7 mi)	The A9 starts near Umag and the Slovenian border, meets the A8 motorway at Kanfanar interchange, and proceeds south to Pula, forming the western arm of Istrian Y.	
A10	Bosnian border - Ploče interchange	8.6 km (5.3 mi)	The A10 starts at Bosnian border, where it connects to A1 motorway in Bosnia and runs to the Ploče interchange, where it connects to A1 motorway.	
A11	Zagreb - Sisak	41 km (25 mi)	The A11 starts at Jakuševec interchange and runs south to Sisak interchange. It was connected to A3 in November 2015 and it is opened to Sisak in October 2024.	

==== Motorway sections under construction ====
Motorway	County	Length	Section	Description	Scheduled completion
A7	Primorje-Gorski Kotar	5.2 km (3.2 mi)	Križišće–Jadranovo	Construction began in October 2026. The project consists of the 2,060-meter-long Križišće Tunnel, two viaducts and two carriageways, and the Jadranovo interchange, along with the reconstruction of the Križišće interchange and the construction of a connecting road to the Adriatic Highway.	October 2029
A7	Primorje-Gorski Kotar	6.5 km (4.0 mi)	Novi Vinodolski bypass	Construction began in September 2021 and will consist of two lane expressway that will match the left lane of the future motorway.	Q4 2027
A8	Primorje-Gorski Kotar	11 km (6.8 mi)	Učka Tunnel–Matulji	Construction of additional two lanes started in September 2023.	Q1 2027
A9	Istria	2.5 km (1.6 mi)	Mirna Bridge	Construction of bridge for upgrading motorway on four lanes in total, the construction started in February 2024.	End of 2026

==== Planned motorway sections ====
Motorway	County	Length	Section	Notes
A1	City of Zagreb, Zagreb and Karlovac	38.6 km (24.0 mi)	Zagreb–Karlovac	Upgrade to six lanes, the start of the works is planned for second half of 2027.
A1	Karlovac	28.2 km (17.5 mi)	Karlovac–Bosiljevo 2	Upgrade to six lanes. Start of works after completion of the Zagreb-Karlovac section.
A1	Dubrovnik-Neretva	18.4 km (11.4 mi)	Metković–Pelješac	As of July 2025, this section was undergoing field investigation works for the purpose of preparing an environmental impact study for the project.
A1	Dubrovnik-Neretva	29.5 km (18.3 mi)	Rudine–Osojnik (Dubrovnik)	The tender for the construction of two parts of this section (9 km and 11.5 km long, resp.) was open in July 2025. The remaining part was undergoing field investigation works for the purpose of preparing an environmental impact study for the project.
A1	Dubrovnik-Neretva	4.2 km (2.6 mi)	Osojnik–Nova Mokošica border crossing	Planning started.
A2	Krapina-Zagorje	3.7 km (2.3 mi)	Đurmanec–Macelj	The construction of tunnels Sveta Tri Kralja and Brezovica so the section is upgraded to four lane motorway was expected to begin in the fall of 2022.
A3	City of Zagreb	4.5 km (2.8 mi)	Jankomir–Lučko	Upgrade to six lanes. Construction starts at autumn 2026.
A3	Zagreb and City of Zagreb	20.5 km (12.7 mi)	Lučko–Ivanja Reka	Upgrade to six lanes. Start of works after completion of the Jankomir-Lučko section.
A7	Primorje-Gorski Kotar	12.3 km (7.6 mi)	Jadranovo–Selce	Construction work on this section is expected to begin in September 2026, and the completion deadline is 42 months from the contractor's introduction into the work.
A7	Primorje-Gorski Kotar	6.5 km (4.0 mi)	Novi Vinodolski bypass	Design started in 2023 and competition for construction will start on the end 2026 completing remaining two lanes that will match the right lane of the motorway.
A7	Primorje-Gorski Kotar and Lika-Senj	21 km (13 mi)	Novi Vinodolski–Senj	A conceptual design has been developed and the coordination of spatial plans is underway. In parallel, an Environmental Impact Study is being prepared and field research is ongoing.
A7	Lika-Senj	10.8 km (6.7 mi)	Senj–Žuta Lokva	The preparation of project documentation up to the location permit has been contracted, a conceptual design has been developed, and the Environmental Impact Study is being prepared, and field research is underway.

=== Traffic cost revenue ===
In 2025, the network had a traffic of 101,416,327 vehicles, including 89,134,555 light vehicles and 12,281,772 heavy vehicles (difference by axle height).

The travel cost is 0.08 euros per km for light vehicles in closed system and 0.06 euros in open toll system, while for heavy ones are 0.34 euros per km in closed system and 0.21 in open system.

Those costs generate a revenue of 569.5 millions of euros (without VAT) in 2025.

=== Accidents ===
Two third of motorway fatalities (67%) occurred in the third of the year between July and October.

Traffic accidents. View chart definition.
Fatalities. View chart definition.
Motorways fatalities rate per population. View chart definition.

== Expressways ==
Roads designated exclusively for motor vehicles are marked with this sign in Croatia

There is a wide variety of types of expressways in Croatia, in terms of number of lanes, accessibility and types of intersections comprised. They range from four lane expressways with grade-separated intersections and limited access - distinguished from the motorways by lack of emergency lanes only - to four or six lane urban expressways with numerous at-grade intersections and traffic lights or two lane limited access roads with grade separated intersections. The expressways include both incomplete motorways, built in stages, and some state roads (with either limited access, more than two traffic lanes, grade-separated intersections or any combination thereof). There are even some instances of county roads which may be regarded expressways such as Jadranska Avenue (Ž1040).

As a rule, the expressways are not tolled; however, major tunnels on the expressways are tolled.

=== List of completed expressways ===
Number	Length	Control cities	Notes
D1	11.5 km (7.1 mi)	Karlovac interchange (A1) - Cerovac Vukmanićki	four lane dual carriageway / two lane single carriageway, with at-grade intersections
D1	5.1 km (3.2 mi)	Udbina western bypass	two lane single carriageway, with grade separated intersections
D1	15 km (9.3 mi)	Dugopolje interchange (A1) - Split	four lane dual carriageway, with grade separated intersections
D2	13 km (8.1 mi)	Osijek southern bypass	four lane dual carriageway, with grade separated intersections
D5	4.7 km (2.9 mi)	Novi Varoš - Stara Gradiška	four lane dual carriageway, with grade separated intersections
D8	11.4 km (7.1 mi)	sections through and near Split	four lane dual carriageway, with at-grade intersections
D8	32.5 km (20.2 mi)	Duboka interchange – Zaton Doli	two lane single carriageway, with grade separated intersections
D10	34.9 km (21.7 mi)	Sveta Helena interchange (A4) - Križevci	four lane dual carriageway, with grade separated intersections
D12	10.6 km (6.6 mi)	Vrbovec 2 interchange (D10) - Farkaševac	four lane dual carriageway, with grade separated intersections
D14	17.4 km (10.8 mi)	Zabok interchange (A2) – Zlatar Bistrica (D29)	two lane single carriageway, with grade separated intersections
D33	7 km (4.3 mi)	Šibenik interchange (A1) - Šibenik (Vidici interchange)	two lane single carriageway, with grade separated intersections
D76	7.5 km (4.7 mi)	Zagvozd (Biokovo toll booth) - Baška Voda (D8)	two/four lane single carriageway with grade separated intersections
D220	5.4 km (3.4 mi)	Bisko interchange (A1) - Čaporice (D60)	four lane dual carriageway/two lane single carriageway, with grade separated intersections
D404	4.3 km (2.7 mi)	Draga interchange (A7) - Rijeka (Brajdica interchange)	three/four lane single carriageway, with grade separated intersections
D424	17.6 km (10.9 mi)	Zadar 2 interchange (A1) - Zadar (Gaženica Port)	four lane dual carriageway, with grade separated intersections
D425	9.8 km (6.1 mi)	Karamatići toll station (A1) - Ploče (Čeveljuša interchange)	four lane dual carriageway/two lane single carriageway, with grade separated intersections
D522	13 km (8.1 mi)	Gornja Ploča interchange (A1) - Udbina	two lane single carriageway, with grade separated intersections

=== Expressway sections constructed but not opened ===
Number	Length	Section	Notes	Completion
D12	5.1 km (3.2 mi)	Farkaševac - Breza	two lane single carriageway, with grade separated intersections	Construction finished in Summer 2023.
D12	5.6 km (3.5 mi)	Špišić Bukovica - Virovitica interchange	two lane single carriageway, with grade separated intersections	Construction finished in End of 2025. and opening in Mid-2027

=== Expressway sections under constructions ===
Number	Length	Section	Notes	Scheduled completion
D5	3.7 km (2.3 mi)	Okučani interchange (A3) - Novi Varoš	four lane dual carriageway, with grade separated intersections	October 2026
D8	2.6 km (1.6 mi)	Mravince interchange (D1) - TTTS	four lane dual carriageway, with grade separated intersections	Spring 2027
D8	5.2 km (3.2 mi)	TTTS - Gornja Podstrana	four lane dual carriageway, with grade separated intersections	2030
D10	7.5 km (4.7 mi)	Križevci - Kloštar Vojakovački	two lane single carriageway, with grade separated intersections	December 2026
D12	11.8 km (7.3 mi)	Breza - Bjelovar	two lane single carriageway, with grade separated intersections	Spring 2026
D12	9.4 km (5.8 mi)	Bjelovar - Bulinac	two lane single carriageway, with grade separated intersections	July 2028
D35	7.5 km (4.7 mi)	Varaždin interchange (D2) - Cerje Tužno	two lane single carriageway, with at-grade intersections	April 2028
D51	14.75 km (9.17 mi)	Brestovac Požeški - Godinjak	two lane single carriageway, with grade separateds	November 2029
D51	1.4 km (0.87 mi)	Godinjak - Požega interchange (A3)	two lane single carriageway, with grade separateds	November 2029
D55	9.8 km (6.1 mi)	Nuštar - Vukovar	two lane single carriageway, with grade separateds	2029

=== Planned expressway sections ===
Number	Route	Length	Section	Notes
D2	Varaždin - Koprivnice - Virovitica - Osijek - Vinkovci	22 km (14 mi)	Ludbreg interchange (A4) - Koprivnice	four lane dual carriageway & two lane single carriageway, with grade separated intersections
D2	Varaždin - Koprivnice - Virovitica - Osijek - Vinkovci	20 km (12 mi)	Koprivnice bypass	four lane dual carriageway & two lane single carriageway, with grade separated intersections
D2	Varaždin - Koprivnice - Virovitica - Osijek - Vinkovci	33.1 km (20.6 mi)	Koprivnice - Pitomača	four lane dual carriageway & two lane single carriageway, with grade separated intersections
D2	Varaždin - Koprivnice - Virovitica - Osijek - Vinkovci	21.9 km (13.6 mi)	Pitomača - Virovitica	four lane dual carriageway & two lane single carriageway, with grade separated intersections
D2	Varaždin - Koprivnice - Virovitica - Osijek - Vinkovci	9 km (5.6 mi)	Virovitica - Suhopolje	four lane dual carriageway, with grade separated intersections
D2	Varaždin - Koprivnice - Virovitica - Osijek - Vinkovci	23.3 km (14.5 mi)	Suhopolje - Slatina	four lane dual carriageway & two lane single carriageway, with grade separated intersections
D2	Varaždin - Koprivnice - Virovitica - Osijek - Vinkovci	46.2 km (28.7 mi)	Slatina - Našice	four lane dual carriageway & two lane single carriageway, with grade separated intersections
D2	Varaždin - Koprivnice - Virovitica - Osijek - Vinkovci	33.1 km (20.6 mi)	Našice - Čepin	four lane dual carriageway & two lane single carriageway, with grade separated intersections
D2	Varaždin - Koprivnice - Virovitica - Osijek - Vinkovci	39 km (24 mi)	Čepin - Nuštar (Vinkovci)	four lane dual carriageway & two lane single carriageway, with grade separated intersections
D5	Virovitica - Daruvar - Okučani	52.9 km (32.9 mi)	Virovitica - Pakrac	two lane single carriageway, with grade separated intersections
D5	Virovitica - Daruvar - Okučani	12 km (7.5 mi)	Pakrac - Lipik	two lane single carriageway, with grade separated intersections
D5	Virovitica - Daruvar - Okučani	20.7 km (12.9 mi)	Lipik - Okučani	two lane single carriageway, with grade separated intersections
D8	Split - Omiš	8 km (5.0 mi)	Gornja Podstrana - Dugi Rat	four lane dual carriageway, with grade separated intersections
D8	Split - Omiš	3 km (1.9 mi)	Dugi Rat - Omiš	two lane single carriageway, with grade separated intersections
D8	Dubrovnik - Cavtat - Čilipi - Karasovići - border crossing (Montenegro)	7.4 km (4.6 mi)	Dubrovnik bypass	two lane single carriageway, with grade separated intersections
D8	Dubrovnik - Cavtat - Čilipi - Karasovići - border crossing (Montenegro)	13.2 km (8.2 mi)	Dubrovnik - Cavtat	two lane single carriageway, with grade separated intersections
D8	Dubrovnik - Cavtat - Čilipi - Karasovići - border crossing (Montenegro)	9 km (5.6 mi)	Cavtat - Čilipi	two lane single carriageway, with grade separated intersections
D10	Križevci - Koprivnice - Gola - border crossing (Hungary)	10.5 km (6.5 mi)	Kloštar Vojakovački - Velika Mučna	two lane single carriageway, with grade separated intersections
D10	Križevci - Koprivnice - Gola - border crossing (Hungary)	12 km (7.5 mi)	Velika Mučna - Koprivnice jug	two lane single carriageway, with grade separated intersections
D10	Križevci - Koprivnice - Gola - border crossing (Hungary)	5.4 km (3.4 mi)	Koprivnice jug - Koprivnice	two lane single carriageway, with grade separated intersections
D12	Bjelovar - Virovitica - Terezino Polje - border crossing (Hungary)	11.2 km (7.0 mi)	Bulinac - Velika Pisanica	two lane single carriageway, with grade separated intersections
D12	Bjelovar - Virovitica - Terezino Polje - border crossing (Hungary)	19 km (12 mi)	Velika Pisanica - Špišić Bukovica	two lane single carriageway, with grade separated intersections
D14	Zlatar Bistrica - Kašina - Soblinec	3.5 km (2.2 mi)	Zlatar Bistrica - Marija Bistrica	two lane single carriageway, with grade separated intersections
D14	Zlatar Bistrica - Kašina - Soblinec	13.8 km (8.6 mi)	Marija Bistrica - Kašina	two lane single carriageway, with grade separated intersections
D14	Zlatar Bistrica - Kašina - Soblinec	6.1 km (3.8 mi)	Kašina - Popovec interchange (A4)	two lane single carriageway, with grade separated intersections
D33	Šibenik - Drniš - Knin - Strmica - border crossing (Bosnia and Herzegovina)	19.1 km (11.9 mi)	Tromilja (Šibenik northeast) - Drniš	four lane dual carriageway & two lane single carriageway, with grade separated intersections)
D33	Šibenik - Drniš - Knin - Strmica - border crossing (Bosnia and Herzegovina)	1.1 km (0.68 mi)	Drniš bypass	four lane dual carriageway & two lane single carriageway, with grade separated intersections)
D33	Šibenik - Drniš - Knin - Strmica - border crossing (Bosnia and Herzegovina)	26.8 km (16.7 mi)	Drniš - Knin	four lane dual carriageway & two lane single carriageway, with grade separated intersections)
D35	Varaždin - Ivanec - Krapina	6.9 km (4.3 mi)	Cerje Tužno - Ivanec	four lane dual carriageway & two lane single carriageway, with grade separated intersections
D35	Varaždin - Ivanec - Krapina	7.5 km (4.7 mi)	Ivanec - Lepoglava	four lane dual carriageway & two lane single carriageway, with grade separated intersections
D55	Vinkovci - Županja - border crossing (Bosnia and Herzegovina)	21 km (13 mi)	Županja 2 interchange (A3) - Vinkovci	four lane dual carriageway, with grade separated intersections

== State roads ==
State roads are defined by legislation as important routes for road traffic between various parts of the country. Classification of a road as a state road does not describe actual conditions of the road itself.

State roads in Croatia are assigned one, two or three digit numbers which generally comply with the following pattern (although there are some exceptions to the rules):

- 1-9 are assigned to trunk roads, normally of considerable length, spanning between borders of various neighboring countries. An obvious exception to this is the D9 state road; however, it spans from Bosnia and Herzegovina border and the Adriatic Sea, along the southernmost portion of Pan-European Corridor Vc.
- 10-99 are assigned to arterial roads on the mainland.
- 100s are assigned to island roads
- 200s are assigned to border crossing access roads.
- 300s are assigned to junction roads, connecting towns or cities (but not other state roads) to motorways or other major roads. Notable exceptions to this are D307 and D310 state roads, although the D307 originally did not connect to the D29, but only to the A2 motorway.
- 400s are assigned to mainland port and airport access roads.
- 500s are assigned to connecting roads, connecting two different state roads. Notable exceptions to this rule are the D503 which connects to a port and the D516 which connects to a border crossing checkpoint.
- 600s are provisional designations. For example, the road containing Pelješac bridge, from Komarna (D8) to Ston (D416), was designated as D674.

At the moment the state roads in Croatia have a combined length of 6,867.7 kilometres (4,267.4 mi).

=== D1 - D9 ===
Number	Control cities (or other appropriate route description)	Length
D1	Gornji Macelj (A2) - Krapina - Zagreb - Karlovac - Gračac - Knin - Sinj - Split (D8)	419.15 km
D2	Dubrava Križovljanska border crossing (Slovenia) - Koprivnica - Virovitica - Sveti Đurađ- Našice - Osijek - Vukovar - Ilok border crossing (Serbia)	347.23 km
D3	Goričan border crossing (Hungary) - Hodošan (A4) - Čakovec - Varaždin - Breznički Hum - Popovec (A1) - Karlovac - Rijeka (D8)	220.65 km
D5	Terezino Polje border crossing (Hungary) - Virovitica - Veliki Zdenci - Donji Daruvar - Lipik - Stara Gradiška border crossing (Bosnia and Herzegovina)	123.19 km
D6	Jurovski Brod border crossing (Slovenia) - Ribnik - Karlovac - Brezova Glava - Vojnić - Glina - Dvor border crossing (Bosnia and Herzegovina)	134.65 km
D7	Duboševica border crossing (Hungary) - Beli Manastir - Osijek - Đakovo - Slavonski Šamac border crossing (Bosnia and Herzegovina)	115.26 km
D8	Pasjak border crossing (Slovenia) - Matulji - Rijeka - Zadar - Split - Pelješac - Dubrovnik - Karasovići border crossing (Montenegro)	657.70 km
D9	Metković border crossing (Bosnia and Herzegovina) - Opuzen (D8)	10.63 km

=== D10 - D77 ===
Number	Control cities (or other appropriate route description)	Length
D10	Sveta Helena interchange (A4) - Cugovec - Križevci - Koprivnica - Gola border crossing (Hungary)	85.35 km
D12	Zabrđe (D10) - Haganj - Zvonik - Bjelovar - Virovitica - Terezino Polje border crossing (Hungary)	90.54 km
D14	Mokrice (D307) - Donja Zabočka - Bedekovičina - Selnica - Podgrađe (D29)	17.42 km
D20	Čakovec (D3) – Prelog – Donja Dubrava – Đelekovec – Koprivnica (D2)	50.4 km
D22	D3 - Novi Marof – Križevci – Sveti Ivan Žabno	42.7 km
D23	Duga Resa (D3) – Josipdol – Žuta Lokva – Senj (D8)	103.9 km
D24	Zabok (D1) – Zlatar Bistrica – Donja Konjšćina – Budinšćina – Novi Marof – Varaždinske Toplice – Poljanec (D2)	72.4 km
D25	Korenica (D1) – Bunić – Lički Osik – Gospić – Karlobag (D8)	83.6 km
D26	Dubrava (D10) - Čazma - Garešnica - Dežanovac - Daruvar (D5)	88.5 km
D27	Gračac (D1) - Obrovac - Benkovac - Stankovci - D8	96.9 km
D28	Gradec (D10) - Bjelovar - Veliki Zdenci (D5)	70.7 km
D29	Novi Golubovec (D35) - Zlatar Bistrica - Marija Bistrica - Soblinec (D3)	49.8 km
D30	Buzin interchange (A3) - Velika Gorica - Petrinja - Hrvatska Kostajnica border checkpoint (Bosnia and Herzegovina)	83.1 km
D31	Velika Gorica (D30) - Gornji Viduševac - D6	56.1 km
D32	Prezid border checkpoint (Slovenia) - Delnice (D3)	49.7 km
D33	Strmica border checkpoint (Bosnia and Herzegovina) - Knin - Drniš - Vidici (D8)	73.3 km
D34	Slatina (D2) - Donji Miholjac - Josipovac (D2)	79.0 km
D35	Varaždin (D2) - Lepoglava - Sveti Križ Začretje (D1)	46.0 km
D36	Karlovac (D1) - Pokupsko - Sisak - Popovača (Ž3124)	110.5 km
D37	Sisak (D36) - Petrinja - Glina (D6)	34.4 km
D38	Pakrac (D5) - Požega - Pleternica - Đakovo (D7)	120.7 km
D39	Bosnian Border - Aržano - Cista Provo - Šestanovac roundabout - Dubci (D8)	37.3 km
D40	Sveti Kuzam interchange (A7) - D8 - Port of Bakar (West)	3.1 km
D41	Gola border checkpoint - Koprivnica - Križevci (D22)	82.9 km
D42	Vrbovsko (D3) - Ogulin - Josipdol - Plaški - Grabovac (D1)	57.9 km
D43	Đurđevac (D2) - Bjelovar - Čazma - Ivanić Grad interchange (A3)	78.1 km
D44	Nova Vas interchange (A9) - Ponte Porton - Buzet - Lupoglav interchange (A8)	50.5 km
D45	Veliki Zdenci - (D5) - Garešnica - Kutina interchange A3	43.6 km
D46	Đakovo D7 -Vinkovci - Tovarnik border checkpoint (Serbia)	73.0 km
D47	Lipik (D5) - Novska - Hrvatska Dubica - Hrvatska Kostajnica - Dvor (D6)	94.5 km
D48	Baderna interchange (A9) - Pazin - Rogovići interchange (A8)	20.8 km
D49	Pleternica - Lužani interchange (A3)	19.2 km
D50	Žuta Lokva (D23) - Otočac - Gospić - Gračac (D40)	104.2 km
D51	Gradište (D53) - Požega - Nova Gradiška interchange (A3)	50.3 km
D52	Špilnik (D50) - Korenica (D1)	41.1 km
D53	Donji Miholjac border checkpoint (Hungary) - Našice - Slavonski Brod border checkpoint (Bosnia and Herzegovina)	91.6 km
D54	Maslenica (D8) - Zaton Obrovački D27	13.5 km
D55	Borovo (D2) - Vinkovci - Županja border checkpoint (Bosnia and Herzegovina)	48.6 km
D56	Tromilja interchange (D424) – Benkovac – Skradin – Drniš (D33) – Muć – Klis–Grlo interchange (D1)	119.6 km
D57	Vukovar (D2) - Orolik - Nijemci - Lipovac interchange A3	36.1 km
D58	Šibenik (port) - Boraja - Trogir (D8)	43.0 km
D59	Knin (D8) - Kistanje - Bribirske Mostine - Putičanje - Kapela (D8)	53.9 km
D60	Brnaze (D1) - Trilj - Cista Provo - Imotski - Vinjani Donji border checkpoint (Bosnia and Herzegovina)	66.1 km
D62	Šestanovac (D39) - Zagvozd - Vrgorac - Kula Norinska - Metković (D9)	89.5 km
D64	Pazin (D48) - Potpićan - Vozilići (D66)	26.9 km
D66	Pula (D400) - Labin - Opatija - Matulji (D8)	90.1 km
D69	Slatina (D2) - Čeralije - Voćin - Novo Zvečevo - Kamenska (D38)	53.4 km
D70	Omiš (D8) - Naklice - Gata - Blato na Cetini interchange (A1)	21.6 km
D72	Slavonski Brod: D53 - Svačićeva - I. G. Kovačića - N. Zrinskog (D423)	2.7 km
D74	Đurmanec (D207) - Krapina - Bednja - Lepoglava (D35)	22.0 km
D75	D200 - Savudrija - Umag - Novigrad - Poreč - Vrsar - Vrh Lima - Bale - Pula (D400)	101.7 km
D76	Baško Polje (D8) – Zagvozd (D62) – Grubine (D60) – Imotski – Gornji Vinjani border checkpoint (Bosnia and Herzegovina)	28.3 km
D77	Rogovići interchange (A8) – Žminj – Svetvinčenat – Vodnjan (D75)	33.2 km
D78	Čakovec (D209) – Mihovljan (Mihovljanska ulica)	1.79 km
D80	Donji Daruvar (D5) – Đulovac - Suhopolje (D2)	38.13 km
D99	Kraljevica (L58107) – Križišće (D501) – Bribir (Ž5062) – Novi Vinodolski (D8)	25.47 km

=== D100 - D128 ===
Number	Control cities (or other appropriate route description)	Length
D100	Porozina (ferry port) - Cres - Mali Lošinj (Ž5159)	80.5 km
D101	D100 - Merag (ferry port)	10.9 km
D102	Šmrika (D8) - Krk - Baška	48.3 km
D103	D102 - Rijeka Airport	1.7 km
D104	D102- Valbiska (ferry port)	10.1 km
D105	Lopar (ferry port) - Rab - Mišnjak (ferry port)	22.7 km
D106	Žigljen (ferry port) - Novalja - Pag - Ražanac - Posedarje (D8)	73.8 km
D109	Veli Rat - Savar - Sali	41.9 km
D110	Muline (ferry port) - Ugljan - Tkon (ferry port)	41.6 km
D111	Maslinica - Grohote - Stomorska	17.8 km
D112	Rogač (ferry port) - D111	1.9 km
D113	Supetar - Nerežišće - Sumartin (ferry port)	39.4 km
D114	Milna - Sutivan - Supetar (D113)	18.8 km
D115	Gornji Humac (D113) - Bol	11.4 km
D116	Hvar - Milna - Starigrad (ferry port) - Sućuraj	77.8 km
D117	Komiža - Podhum - Vis	19.9 km
D118	Vela Luka - Kapja - Dubovo - Korčula	43.5 km
D119	Ubli - Lastovo	9.5 km
D120	Pomena - Polače - Sobra - Saplunara	42.9 km
D121	Murter - Tisno - D8	14.0 km
D123	Sobra (ferry port) - D120	1.1 km
D124	Brbinj (ferry port) - Brbinj - D109	1.7 km
D125	Zaglav (ferry port) - D109	1.1 km
D126	Trogir (D315) - Arbanija - Slatine	8.3 km
D128	Uvala Mikavica - Žirje (ferry port)	3.8 km

== County Roads ==
In Croatia, county roads (županijska cesta) are designated with a 4 digit number, and they are usually labeled with the letter Ž.

== Tolls ==
In the Republic of Croatia, primarily a closed toll system is applied to the entire motorway network tolls with multiple entrances and exits. The use of motorways is charged by mileage and vehicle category. At the entrance on the motorway, the user picks up the entrance card (or a record recorded on the ENC device) and the payment is made on exit toll stations according to the length of the trip. The open system is in use at toll stations Bregana(A3) and Rupa(A7).

=== New system under construction ===
The new electronic toll collection system Crolibertas is a strategic project with a completely different way of paying tolls. The Crolibertas system will be introduced on all motorways in the Republic of Croatia, operated by HAC), Bina-Istra and AZM. The Crolibertas toll collection system is based on the free flow of vehicles in multiple lanes (multi lane free flow – MLFF) with a combination of DSRC (ENC device) and ALPR (with cameras).

On 24 September 2024, Croatian Motorways signed a contract for the implementation of a new toll collection system with a consortium of bidders consisting of the Slovak company SkyToll and the Czech TollNet. The value of the contract is €79,913,480.52 excluding VAT, of which €64,167,383.70 relates to the design, construction and equipping of the toll collection system, and the rest relates to spare parts and a ten-year maintenance period for the system.

The system will consist of 208 toll booths on all highways, 140 fast lanes for registration and 74 mobile units (cars) for user supervision.

== Safety ==
Croatia had 62 road deaths per million inhabitants estimated in 2025.

== See also ==
- Transport in Croatia
- Hrvatske autoceste
- Autocesta Rijeka – Zagreb
- BINA Istra
- Autocesta Zagreb – Macelj
- Hrvatske ceste
- List of controlled-access highway systems
- Evolution of motorway construction in European nations
- Speed limits in Croatia
