= D531 road =

Road in Croatia

D531 state road

Route information
- Length: 2.1 km (1.3 mi)

Major junctions
- From: D58 near Vrpolje
- To: A1 in Vrpolje interchange

Location
- Country: Croatia
- Counties: Zadar

Highway system
- Highways in Croatia

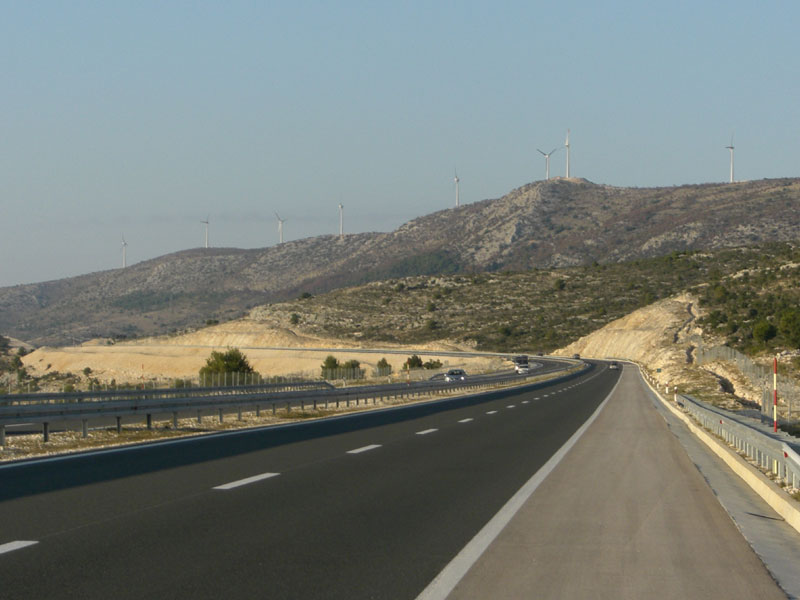
The A1 motorway near the D531 junction

D531 is a state road connecting the A1 motorway in Vrpolje interchange to D58 state road. The road is 2.1 km long.

The road and indeed all state roads in Croatia are managed and maintained by Hrvatske ceste, state owned company.

== Traffic volume ==
The D531 state road traffic volume is not reported by Hrvatske ceste, however they regularly count and report traffic volume on the A1 motorway Vrpolje interchange, which connects to the D531 road only, thus permitting the D531 road traffic volume to be accurately calculated. The report includes no information on ASDT volumes.

D531 traffic volume
Road	Counting site	AADT	ASDT	Notes
A1	Vrpolje interchange	57	n/a	Southbound A1 traffic leaving the motorway at the interchange.
A1	Vrpolje interchange	134	n/a	Southbound A1 traffic entering the motorway at the interchange.
A1	Vrpolje interchange	102	n/a	Northbound A1 traffic leaving the motorway at the interchange.
A1	Vrpolje interchange	60	n/a	Northbound A1 traffic entering the motorway at the interchange.
D531	Vrpolje interchange	353	n/a	Total traffic entering/leaving the A1 motorway from/to D531.

== Road junctions and populated areas ==
D531 junctions
Type	Slip roads/Notes
	Vrpolje interchange. A1 to Split to the south and to Zadar and Zagreb to the north. Northern terminus of the road.
	D58 to Šibenik ferry port to the west and to Kaštela and Split to the east. Southern terminus of the road.
