= Vinko Vrbanić =

Croatian writer (born 1951)

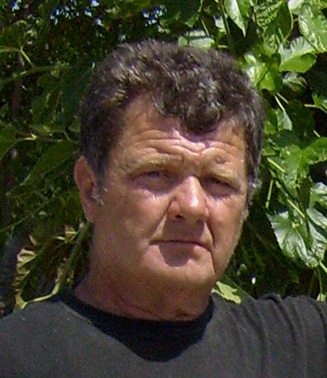
- Vinko Vrbanić in Vinkovci, July 2009
- Born: 12 May 1951 (age 75); Novi Varoš, PR Croatia, FPR Yugoslavia
- Died: 7 January 2024; Vinkovci
- Education: School of Agriculture in Požega
- Occupations: Short story writer, novelist
- Writing career
- Period: 2009–present

Vinko Vrbanić (12 May 1951 – 7 January 2024) is a Croatian writer who lived in Vinkovci, Croatia. He is best known for his published short stories, novellas Furmani (Carters) and Sokolov let (Flight of the Falcon), and coming-of-age novel Glasovi u šumi (Voices in the Forest). He graduated from the School of Agriculture in Požega, worked in construction, and fought in the Croatian War of Independence.

== Genre ==
Novellas Furmani [Carters] and Sokolov let [Flight of the Falcon] are collections of diverse tales connected by loose narratives about the tragic lives of common folk. Whereas, the coming-of-age novel Glasovi u šumi [Voices in the Forest] traces the life of a mischievous boy growing up in a Croatian village during times of socio-political upheaval. “At last, we received a storyteller who stepped away from traditional themes and turned towards the urban setting, telling stories that avoid romantic or melodramatic content,” says Zlatko Virc in Vinkovacki list [Vinkovci Newspaper].

== Themes ==
The short stories in Sokolov let [Flight of the Falcon] trace the struggles and destinies of the ordinary people caught between the great military powers during the decline of the Ottoman Empire. In Furmani [Carters], the author examined fate in short stories about people from the bottom of the social ladder who turn to alcohol as a way to cope with their broken lives. His coming-of-age novel Glasovi u šumi [Voices in the Forest] captures the persistent struggle for a better life and brutality of those in power.

== Style ==
Vrbanić wrote short, inter-connected narratives with a discernible beginning, climax, and resolution encapsulated within self-contained chapters that demonstrate the author's skill as storyteller from an oral tradition.

== Bibliography ==
- Novel Voices in the Forest, Independently published, 2019 ISBN 9781070167749
- Short story "Gvozdansko" (Cro), književnost.hr, KNJIŽEVNOST.HR, 2018
- Short story "Gvozdansko" (Eng), ZiN Daily, ZVONA i NARI, 2018
- Short story "Kuga", književnost.hr, KNJIŽEVNOST.HR, 2018
- Short story "Beograd", ZiN Daily, ZVONA i NARI, 2018
- Short story "Cvija", Darežljivo srce, Glas Koncila, 2016
- Short story “Rakija”, Dar Domovine, Glas Koncila, 2014
- Novel Glasovi u šumi, Modimac Ltd., 2012
- Novellas Furmani–Sokolov let, Modimac Ltd., 2011
- Short story "Riječka luka", Moji Vinkovci, Privlačica, 2010
- Short stories "Džepni sat" and "Božić", Moji Vinkovci, Privlačica, 2009

== Awards ==
- 2nd shared prize [pohvalnica] for a drama "Dvadeseto pjevanje" at 36th HSK National Literary Competition 2017
- 1st prize for a short story "Cvija" at the Dr. Stjepan Kranjčić Literary Competition 2016
- Short story "Rakija" selected for publication in the journal Dar Domovine, as part of the Dr. Stjepan Kranjčić Literary Competition 2014
