= D58 =

D58 may refer to:

- D58 (Croatia), a state road in Croatia
- New South Wales D58 class locomotive
- HMS Cardiff (D58)
