= D409 road =

Road in Croatia

D409 state road

Route information
- Length: 3.3 km (2.1 mi)

Major junctions
- From: D8 near Plano
- D315 near Pantana
- To: Split Airport

Location
- Country: Croatia
- Counties: Split-Dalmatia

Highway system
- Highways in Croatia

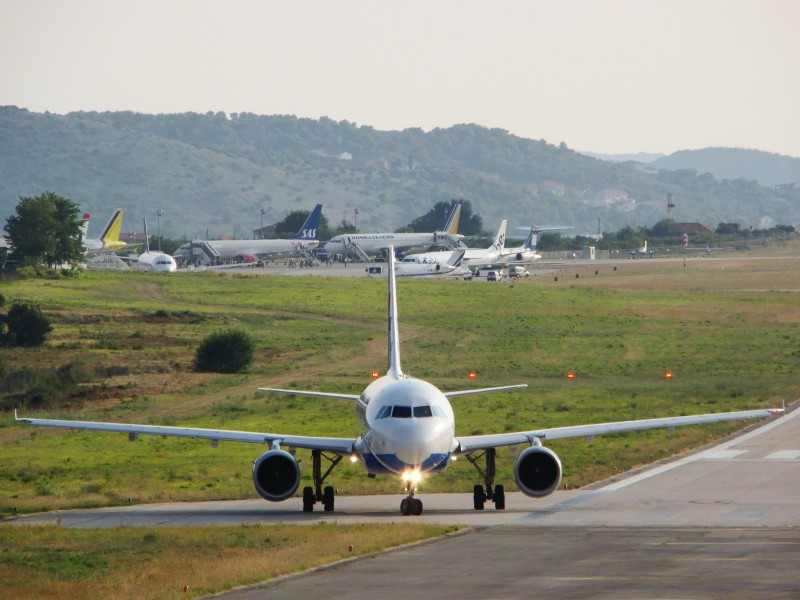
Split Airport, at the southern terminus of the D315 road

D409 is a Croatian state road branching off from D8 state road connecting it to Split Airport and Trogir and Čiovo via D315. The road is 3.3 km long.

The D409, like all state roads in Croatia, is managed and maintained by Hrvatske ceste, a state owned company.

== Road junctions ==
D409 junctions
| Type | Slip roads/Notes |
| | D8 to Split (to the east), and Šibenik (to the west). The northern terminus of the road. |
| | D315 to Trogir |
| | Split Airport - the southern terminus of the road. |

== See also ==
- Split Airport
