= D14 road (Croatia) =

Expressway in central Croatia

D14 state road

Route information
- Length: 17.41 km (10.82 mi) planned 39.6 km (24.6 mi)

Major junctions
- From: A2 in Zabok interchange
- To: D29 in Zlatar Bistrica interchange

Location
- Country: Croatia
- Counties: Zagreb, Krapina-Zagorje

Highway system
- Highways in Croatia

The D14 expressway is a state road in Croatia. The total completed length is 17.41 km and the planned length is 39.6 km.

The state road D14 will be part of the Zagreb Northern Bypass. The road is planned in the full profile of the expressway, but is currently being built in a semi-profile state.

== Exit list ==
| County | Name | Destination | Note |
|---|---|---|---|
| Krapina-Zagorje County | Zabok | A2 E57 D1 D205 D307 | Link with the A2 motorway, Zabok in the north and Oroslavje in the south |
| Krapina-Zagorje County | Andraševec | Ž2197 | Link with Oroslavje and Stubičke Toplice in the south and Zabok in the north |
| Krapina-Zagorje County | Bedekovčina | Ž2198 | Link with Bedekovčina in the north and Donja Stubica in the south |
| Krapina-Zagorje County | Poznanovec | Ž2201 | Link with Donja Stubica and Marija Bistrica via D307 in the south |
| Krapina-Zagorje County | Zlatar Bistrica | D29 | Connection with Zlatar Bistrica and towards Marija Bistrica via D29 |
| Krapina-Zagorje County | Marija Bistrica | D307 | Connection with Marija Bistrica and towards Donja Stubica via D307 |
| Krapina-Zagorje County | Laz Stubički | | |
| Zagreb | Kašina | D29 | Link to Kašina |
| Zagreb | Paruževina | D29 | Link to Paruzevina |
| Zagreb | Soblinec | A4 E65/ E71 D3 | Link with the Zagreb bypass (A4) and D3 |
| Zagreb | 1.000 mi = 1.609 km; 1.000 km = 0.621 mi: Closed/former; Unopened | | |
