= D315 road =

Road in Croatia

D315 state road

Route information
- Length: 2.7 km (1.7 mi)

Major junctions
- From: D409 near Pantana
- To: D126 in Trogir

Location
- Country: Croatia
- Counties: Split-Dalmatia

Highway system
- Highways in Croatia

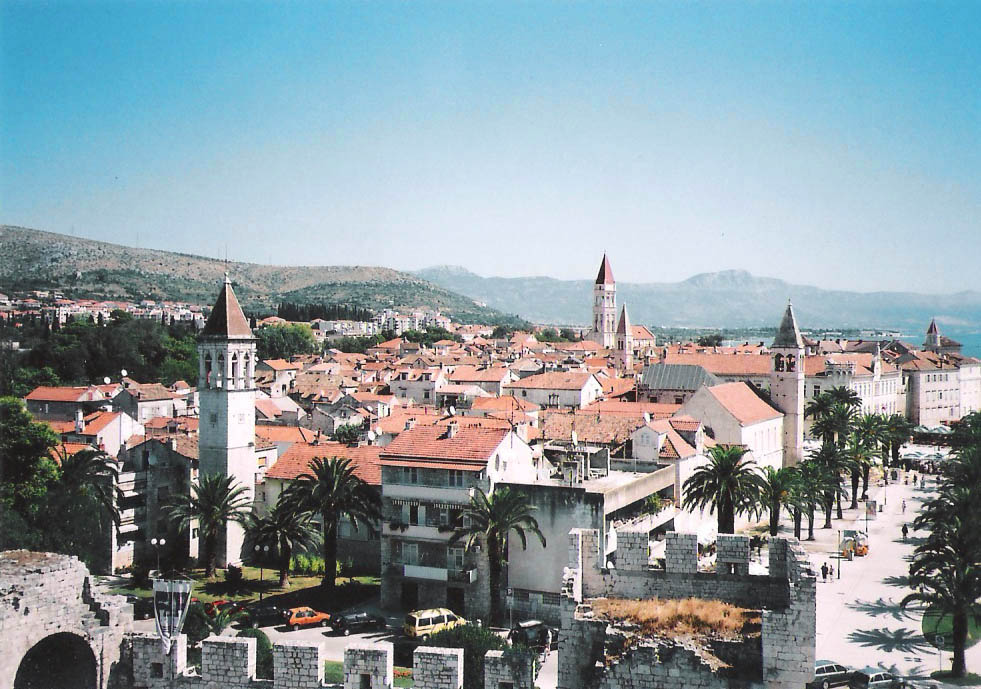
Trogir, at the western terminus of the D315 road

D315 is a state road branching off from D409 state road connecting it to Trogir. The road is 2.7 km long.

The D315 and all other state roads in Croatia are managed and maintained by Hrvatske ceste, state owned company.

== Road junctions ==
D315 junctions
Type	Slip roads/Notes
	D409 to Split Airport (to the south), and D8 state road (to the north). The eastern terminus of the road.
	Trogir; D126 to Čiovo; Ž6133 and Ž6134 to D8 state road. The western terminus of the road.
