= Speed limits in Croatia =

Speed limits in Croatia are regulated by the Road Traffic Safety Act (Croatian: Zakon o sigurnosti prometa na cestama).

Four general speed limits apply on Croatian roads:

- 50 km/h (31 mph) within inhabited places, or up to 80 km/h (50 mph) where explicitly permitted
- 90 km/h (56 mph) outside inhabited places
- 110 km/h (68 mph) on expressways (brza cesta)
- 130 km/h (81 mph) on freeways (autocesta)

Lower speed limits apply to buses, heavy, trailer and towing vehicles, and tractors.

The limits shown above apply only if there are no other signs present, as the signs may prescribe a lower or a higher speed limit or enforce a traffic rule that affects speed.

Due to legal requirements for speed measuring, there is a tolerance of 10 km/h under 100 km/h, and 10% above that.

Limits of 100 km/h or higher can also be found within inhabited places. The lowest legal speed limit under normal traffic conditions is 40 km/h (25 mph).

Depending on the severity of the violation, driving faster than the speed limit is punishable by a fine in the amount between HRK 300 and 20,000 (roughly €40–2650). Exceeding the speed limit by more than 50 km/h in a populated area may also be punished by imprisonment of up to 60 days.

== See also ==
- Highways in Croatia

== Sources ==
- "Road Traffic Safety Act" (PDF). Croatian Ministry of Foreign and European Affairs. June 2008. Archived from the original (PDF) on 20 October 2016.
