= Control city =

City on traffic signs

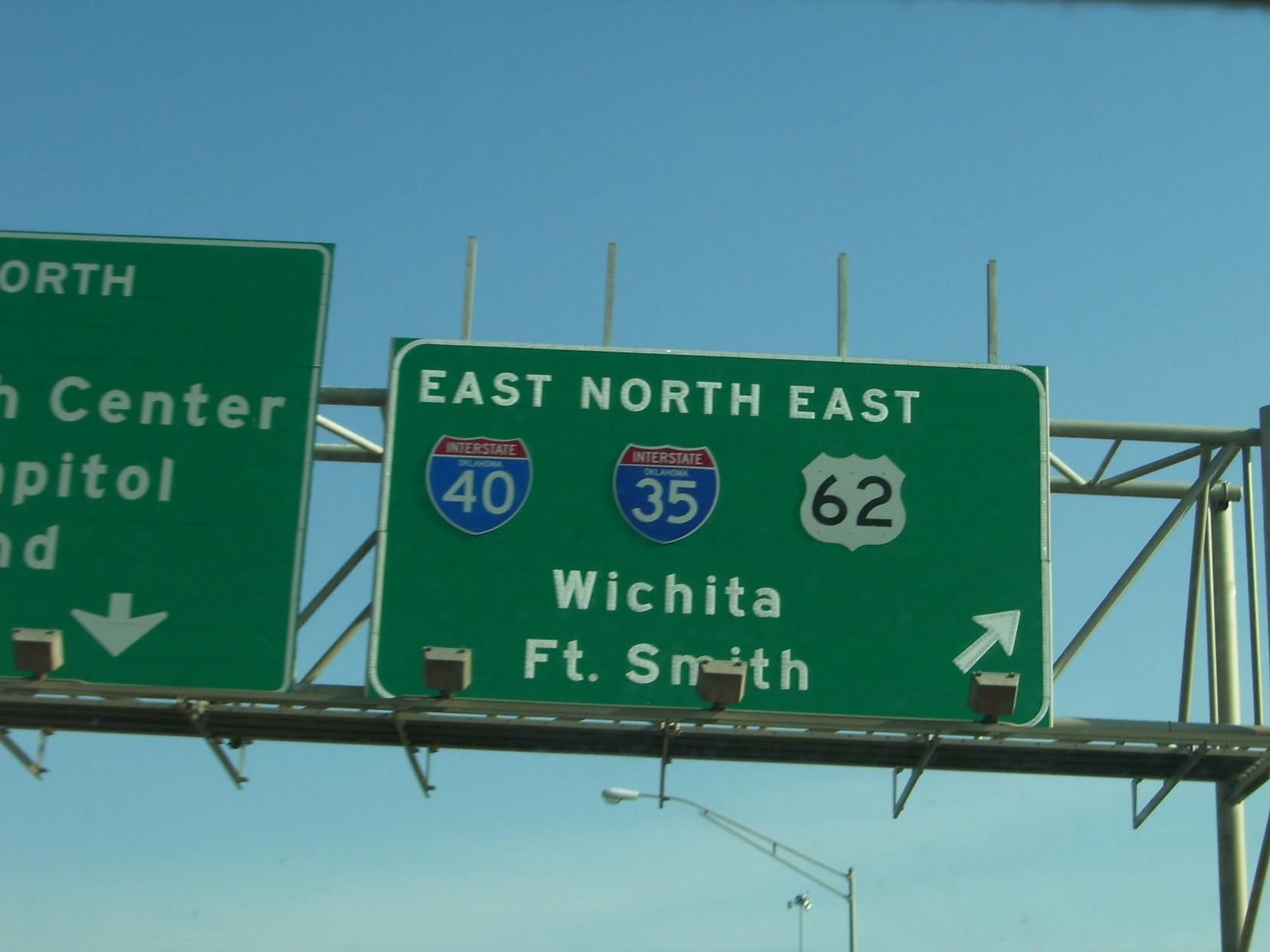
A sign in Oklahoma City, Oklahoma, lists control cities of Wichita, Kansas, and Fort Smith, Arkansas, for Interstate 35 and Interstate 40, respectively.

A control city is a city, locality, or other location posted on a series of traffic signs along a particular stretch of road indicating destinations on that route. Together with route numbers and cardinal directions, these focal points aid the motorist navigating along a highway system. Such cities appear on signs at junctions to indicate where the intersecting road goes and where the road ahead goes. They are also typically used on distance signs.

Different countries have different practices as far as focal points on directional signs are concerned, and the term control city is not used globally. Where a sign contains a number of destinations for a particular direction, not all of those destinations may be considered a control city. In most countries, control cities are perceived to be the destinations on signs that aid longer-distance traffic, as opposed to local traffic. Accordingly, local destinations on a sign, which only appear incidentally, would in a number of countries not be considered control cities.

While a control city may not appear on the signs of every single junction, the control city would at least appear on major junctions.

== Description ==
Towns and cities are most often used as control cities. Other than major towns in a country or region, towns close to major intersections or the end of a particular route are often selected as control cities. However, a wide variety of other potential destinations can be selected as control cities, such as states or regions, frequently visited places, or names of prominent intersecting roads. Narrow corridors carrying large volumes of traffic often also take the role of control city. Examples would be major bridges (the Golden Gate Bridge is a control city within San Francisco), tunnels (e.g. the Holland Tunnel in New York City), or mountain passes (e.g. the Gotthard Pass featuring prominently on signs in Switzerland). In border areas, the border itself regularly features as a control city, e.g. the U.S.-Mexico border for Interstate 5 southbound.

The control city is typically on or close to the route for which it serves as the primary focal point. In exceptional situations, towns along prominent intersecting roads could serve as such, notably when the vast majority of traffic would turn off to that intersecting road. Equally, towns beyond a route's terminus could serve as control city. Particularly when a route merges into another route, a major town along that other route could serve as control city. In the United States, for instance, New Jersey Route 18 southbound says it goes to Point Pleasant but never does. This is because of the stub end at exit 6.

While the vast majority of control cities are sizeable towns, minor towns or even unincorporated localities may feature as control city. This is particularly the case if they are located close to junctions of major roads or near the terminus of a road. Major roads in Poland, for instance, feature many signs that refer to small villages close to the border, since that border marks the route's terminus. Signs in Australia's Northern Territory generally will not refer beyond the state border, with the last control city on the Stuart Highway being SA Border and the same applying on routes heading to Queensland and South Australia. On the other hand, there are also instances where larger cities have not been selected as control city because of the proximity of a bigger city downstream on the road.

A common principle identified in signposting is the principle of continuity. Once a particular destination has featured on a sign, it should feature on all signs that contain forward destinations for that direction. Sometimes particular towns are used on a one-off basis at major intersections, but they would then not be considered the control city for that particular road.

== Europe ==
Unlike in the United States, Canada, and the United Kingdom, roads in Continental Europe are not signed with directional banners (east, west, north, and south). The motorist accordingly needs to rely on the combination of the control city and the route number as navigation tools. Possibly as a result of this, control cities tend to feature rather prominently on the route signs of European countries when compared to signage in North America. Routes tend to feature more signs that contain information for the route forward and those signs often contain a larger number of focal points.

In this context, and bearing in mind that in Europe every country has its own style of signposting, the term control city is not always in use, but most countries use concepts that have a similar role to that of a control city in North America.

Some, but not all, countries like Poland and Switzerland label border crossings and foreign cities as control cities with the international vehicle registration code (D for Germany, NL for the Netherlands, UA for Ukraine, etc.). The border crossing control city in Poland would have priority over other towns along the way even if the signposted border village/town is smaller than many towns along the way or when the particular border crossing is no longer operational due to Poland adopting the Schengen Agreement in 2007.

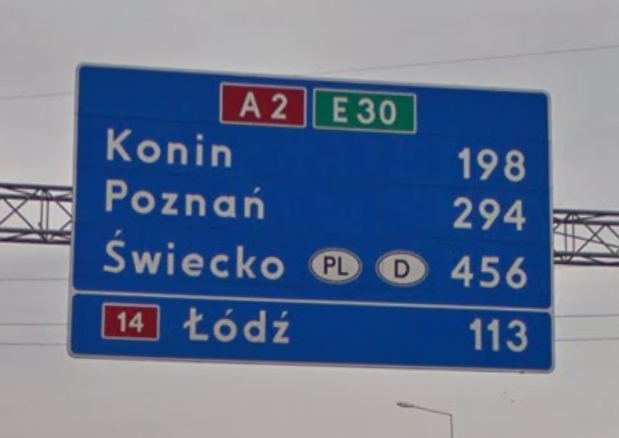
Distance sign showing the distance to the control cities on the A2 autostrada of Konin, Poznań, Łódź by using the motorway and national road 14, and the German-Polish border crossing of Świecko. The border crossing is no longer operational because Poland adopted the Schengen Agreement in 2007.

=== Belgium ===
In Belgium, the route network very much centers around the towns of Antwerp, Brussels, and Liège. On roads leading to these towns, the relevant town typically features as the primary focal point of the route and as the most distant focal point on the distance signs placed after each intersection. On other roads, provincial capitals play a comparable role as control city, while larger towns outside Belgium feature on routes leading out of Belgium.

=== France ===
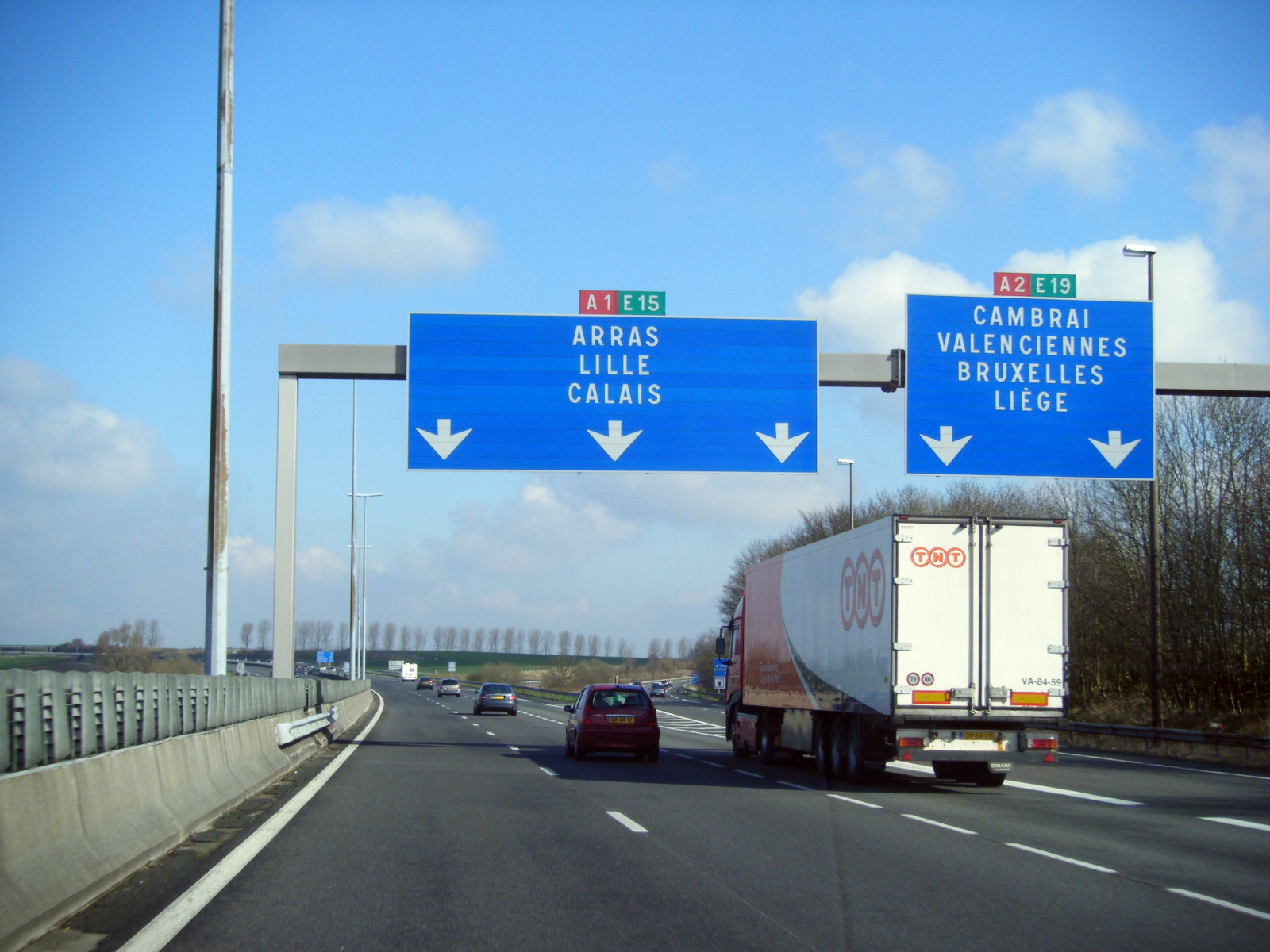
Following the A1 leads to Lille and Calais, and the A2 leads to Belgium- the E19 directly to Brussels and via other routes to Liège.

All French localities have been divided into five categories for signposting purposes, mostly based on their size (though smaller towns with a strategic position in the road network could be promoted while larger suburban towns could be relegated one category). Towns in categories 3, 4, and 5 feature as the focal points on forward signs and distance signs of motorways. On non-motorways, these towns are signposted against a green background whereas other towns are signposted with black letters against a white background. The towns in category 5 are the biggest towns of France, which are also the pivotal points in the French motorway network.

Signs on, and leading to, French motorways generally refer to some three or four towns on that motorway. In other words, there are no stand-out towns that could be referred to as the French equivalent of a control city. The towns signposted have been picked from the three categories signposted along motorways, with towns in category 5 signposted from the biggest distance out (typically, on any motorway that leads to a town in category 5, the first category 5 town ahead is signposted).

=== Germany ===
In the German guidelines for directional signage on motorways, the concept of the Hauptfernziel (translating as main distant focal point) has a role that is comparable to that of a control city in North America. This control city appears on roads leading to a motorway and at on-ramps. The Hauptfernziel is also the most distant point that features on distance signs, which are placed after each exit. Directional signage along motorways tends to also refer to towns other than the Hauptfernziel. These could be local focal points (known as Nahziele), but also smaller towns downstream.

Under German guidelines, a town close to a road's terminus should serve as Hauptfernziel, except that towns close to major functions could also take that role. The major towns of Germany typically double as Hauptfernziel on this basis, notwithstanding the fact that motorways often pass by rather than terminate there. A prominent town that does not feature as Hauptfernziel on a major route would be Düsseldorf, which despite being a regional capital sits squeezed between the major junctions at Oberhausen and Cologne and has no major motorway junction itself. On the longer motorways of Germany, the distance between Hauptfernziele is usually some 150 to 200 kilometres (93 to 124 mi), though less in densely populated areas.

Distance signs on motorways also often feature the Hauptfernziel of one or more intersecting motorways. These are separated from towns along the route proper with a horizontal line.

=== Ireland ===
In the Republic of Ireland, directional banners are used on the M50 (Ó Thuaidh/NORTHBOUND and Ó Dheas/SOUTHBOUND) and on the N40 (Siar/WESTBOUND and Soir/EASTBOUND).

On national roads (which include motorways), the control city is usually a large town at or near the termination of the road. A town on an intersecting road may be used as a control city with its name enclosed in parentheses.

=== Italy ===
Road signs in Italy normally feature one focal point used per direction of a longer stretch of road. This could be considered the control city of that road. Often, this is the town close to the route's terminus, but it could also be a town close to a major intersection or an otherwise major town. Milan, for instance, has this role along the A4 between Turin and Trieste.

On longer non-motorways, a provincial capital often takes the role of control city despite not being close to the route's terminus or a major intersection. Intersecting routes also feature as control city. This often occurs on beltways and spur routes.

In addition to signs showing a route's single control city, Italian routes generally also feature ancillary signs that feature other towns in a particular direction. Unlike the control city, these other towns are not necessarily to be found on subsequent signs along the route signposted. These towns feature on the directional signage for information purposes only.

=== Netherlands ===
In the Netherlands, the guidelines for signposting feature a distinction between regular control cities (called hoofddoel) and network cities (called netwerkdoel). The class, a group of ten cities in each part of the country where major roads intersect, is being signposted in addition to regular control cities. The references to network control cities serve to guide long-distance traffic through the country, unlike the reference to the first regular control city which is seldom more than 30 kilometres (19 mi) away. Network control cities can also be towns on an intersecting road. Since 2010, efforts are being made to create even more prominent references to the towns of Amsterdam and Rotterdam; the former drawing many tourists and the latter drawing many professional drivers to its port. On roads not leading to a network control city, the route's terminus is often signposted in addition to the control city.

=== Scandinavia ===
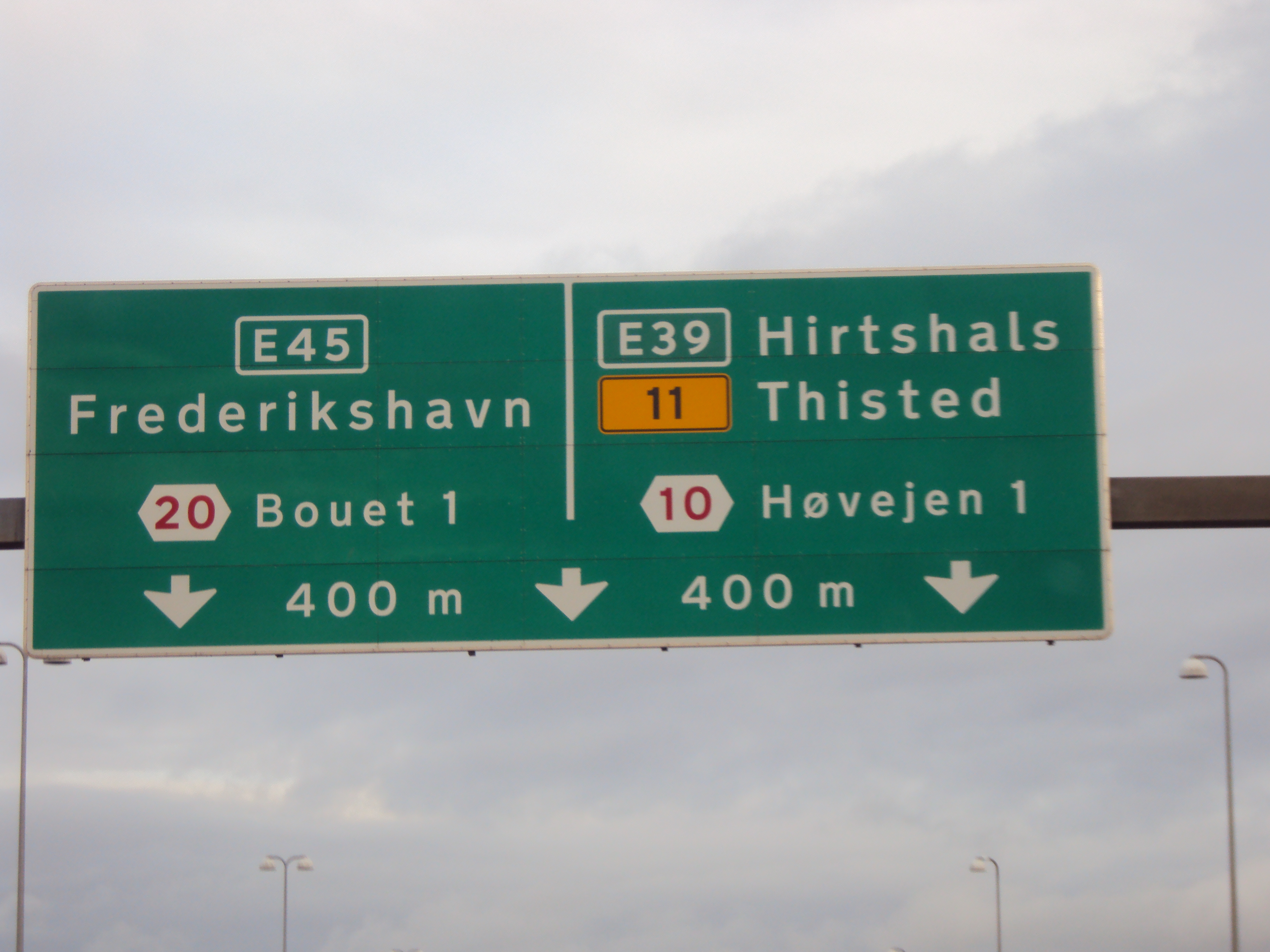
The E45 and E39 split at Nørresundby in Denmark. The overheads show the destinations and on the bottom, the distance to the nearest exit on the two freeways (400 metres (1,300 ft)).

Each of the Scandinavian countries has its own style of signposting, but their styles reveal similarities. Signs on roads in the countries typically feature one town that takes the role of the control city of that particular road. As distances in Scandinavia are longer and the area is sparsely populated, this can be a town that is several hundred kilometers away. Other than local destinations, signs in Scandinavia do not commonly feature other cities in addition to this major town. On less important roads, the town featuring as control city is often the route's terminus. On the main axes of Scandinavia, notably the main north–south routes E4 and E6, larger towns along the routes have been chosen to also appear as control city.

=== United Kingdom ===
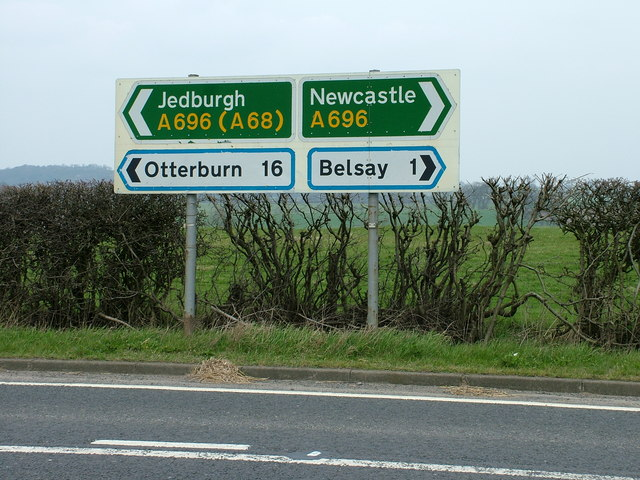
Jedburgh and Newcastle are primary destinations on the A696.

In the United Kingdom, the term control city is not commonly used. Rather, motorists are referred to a primary destination. Primary destinations are typically towns located close to strategic intersections. In London and other large cities, boroughs and major intersections are also in use as primary destinations, with the financial centre itself being signposted as The city. One particular intersection outside London that made it to primary destination is Scotch Corner, the split between two routes from the South into Scotland.

On signs in the United Kingdom, cardinal directions are not used, but one specific aspect of UK signage is the use of regions as a focal point along roads. These regions, which may appear a cardinal direction (e.g. the North, as appears on the A1), serve to direct long-distance traffic. Primary destinations, on the other hand, are typically relatively nearby. As directional signs typically only contain the first one or two primary destinations, traffic needs to rely on the regional focal points to see the general bearing of the route.

Primary destinations that are not on the designated road are shown in brackets as in the image below:

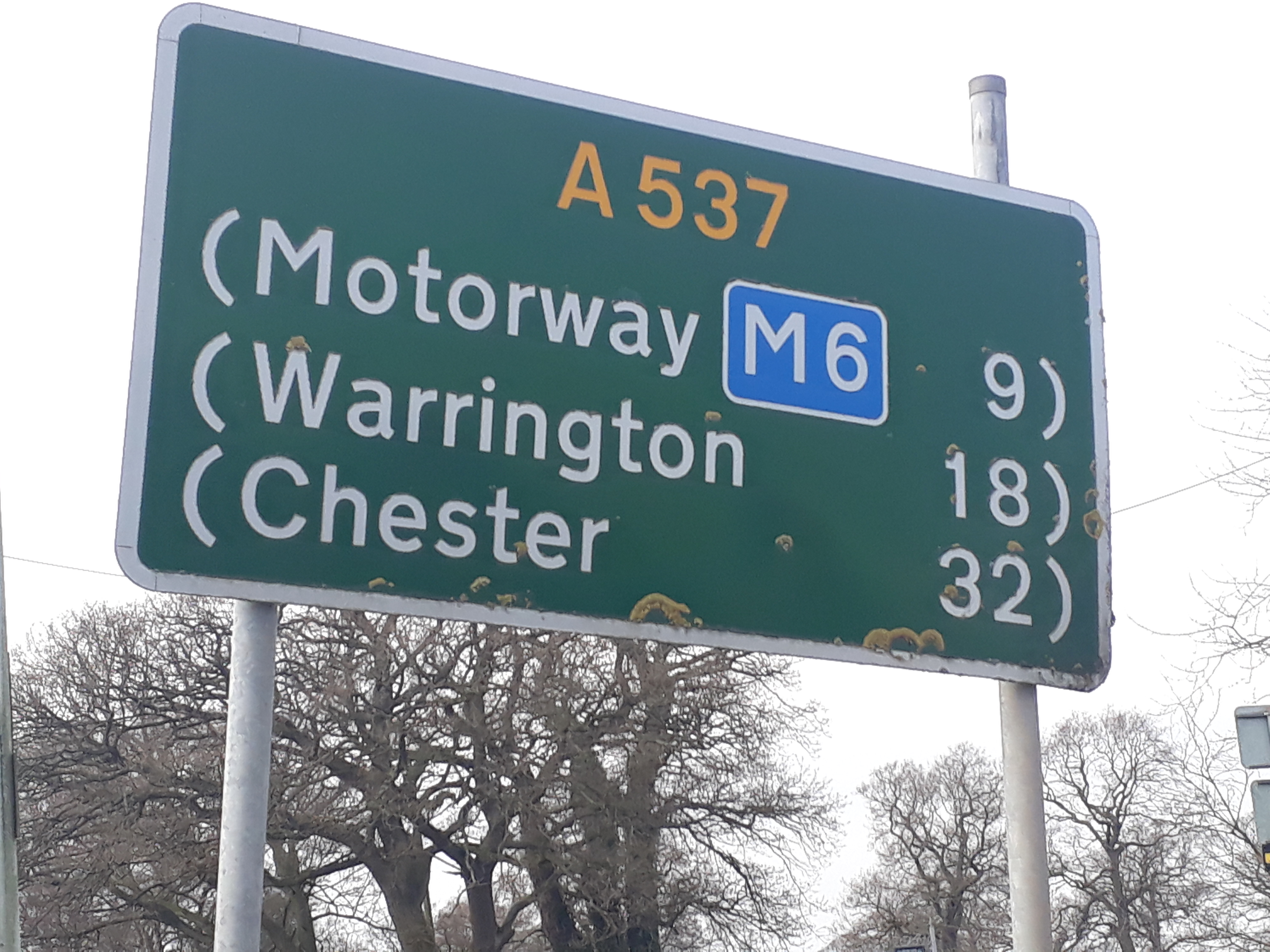
Sign in Cheshire showing the distances to the primary destinations of the M6 motorway, Warrington and Chester. None of these destinations are located on the A537 road so they are written in brackets.

== North America ==
=== Canada ===
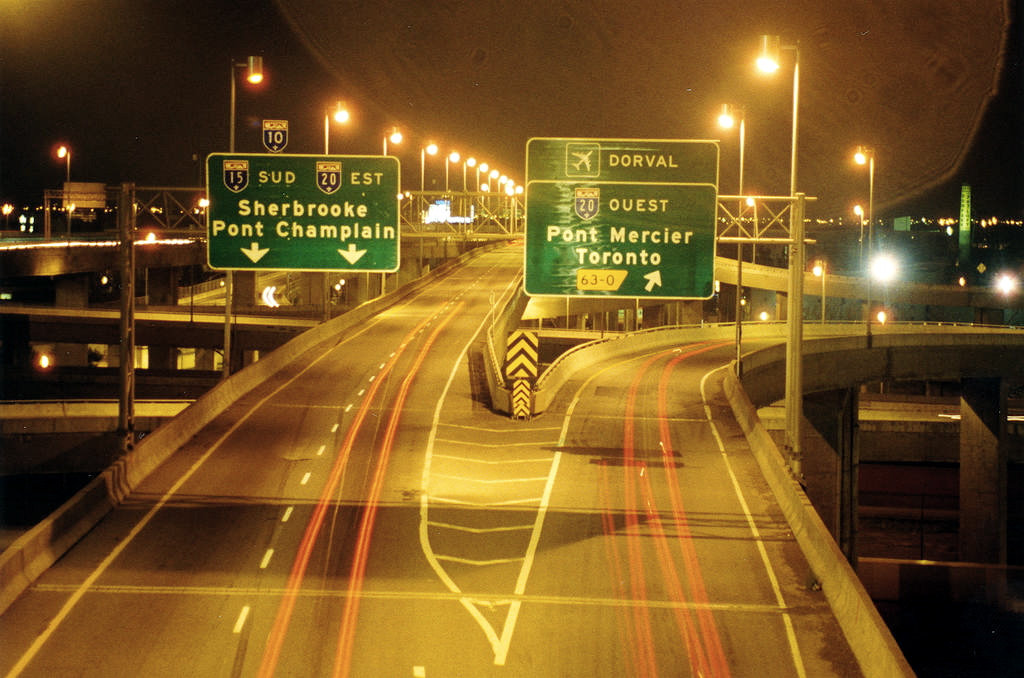
Toronto signed as the control city on A20 in Montreal.

Canada lacks a coherently signed national highway system—even for the Trans-Canada Highway routes—and there is no mutual agreement for designating control cities across provincial boundaries.

Control cities are particularly necessary for highways that do not follow strict linear directions. Ontario's Queen Elizabeth Way, for example, wraps around the western end of Lake Ontario, with segments proceeding both east and west from Hamilton. Compass directions are not used and the control cities of Toronto and (for the opposite direction) Hamilton/Niagara/Fort Erie are the only bearings provided.

==== Ontario ====
Each of the 400-series highways uses control cities, but the common Ontario practice is to use smaller, closer urban centres as alternatives to out-of-province cities. For example, on Highway 401, Cornwall displaces Montreal as eastbound control city for most of the St. Lawrence valley. Windsor, London, Toronto, Kingston, and Cornwall (with Montreal only signed along the short section between Cornwall and the Quebec border), are control cities while larger cities such as Oshawa and Mississauga are omitted due to them being suburbs of Toronto, although in the latter case this is common in most jurisdictions.

The pattern of control city signage is sometimes inconsistent in Ontario. For example, while Barrie and Newmarket are signed as control cities for Highways 400 and 404 respectively on exit signage along Highway 401 in Toronto; London and Kingston are not shown as control cities on signage along these highways as they approach Highway 401. Along Highway 400, the control cities of Toronto, Barrie, and Parry Sound are consistently signed along its southern section, but Barrie and Parry Sound are omitted in its northern section: e.g; northbound, the control city changes to Sudbury even before the highway reaches Parry Sound, while Toronto is signed in two different sections southbound.

==== Quebec ====
The Ministère des Transports du Québec typically uses large urban centres as control cities, even if they are far away and/or outside the province. For example, signs in Montreal indicate control cities as far as Toronto and Ottawa on Autoroutes such as 20 and 40 respectively. New York City and Vermont are used as control cities for Autoroutes 15 and 35 respectively. This may cause confusion to motorists unfamiliar with this convention, as the control cities may change at the continuations of these autoroutes into the adjoining jurisdictions; Cornwall (and then Kingston) are signed along Highway 401 in Eastern Ontario rather than Toronto, while Albany is signed along Interstate 87 in Northern New York.

==== New Brunswick ====
The New Brunswick Department of Transportation tends to use cities within the province as control cities. The Trans-Canada Highway uses Edmundston, Fredericton, Moncton, and Sackville as control cities from north to south. Places in bordering provinces are used sparingly, and only after they are the only remaining destination on the highway. Route 95, the link between the Trans-Canada Highway and Interstate 95, uses only Houlton, Maine as a control city to the west.

==== British Columbia ====
British Columbia tends to use cities and towns at or near junctions of numbered highways as control cities regardless of population levels, amenities or otherwise importance of those places which includes the choice of control cities that are outside BC. For example Aspen Grove despite being a very small town is used as a control city because the junction of the Okanagan Connector Hwy 97C and Hwy 5A is located at the edge of town. If a route contains a ferry crossing the name of the ferry terminal can be used in addition to or in place of a control city.

=== United States ===
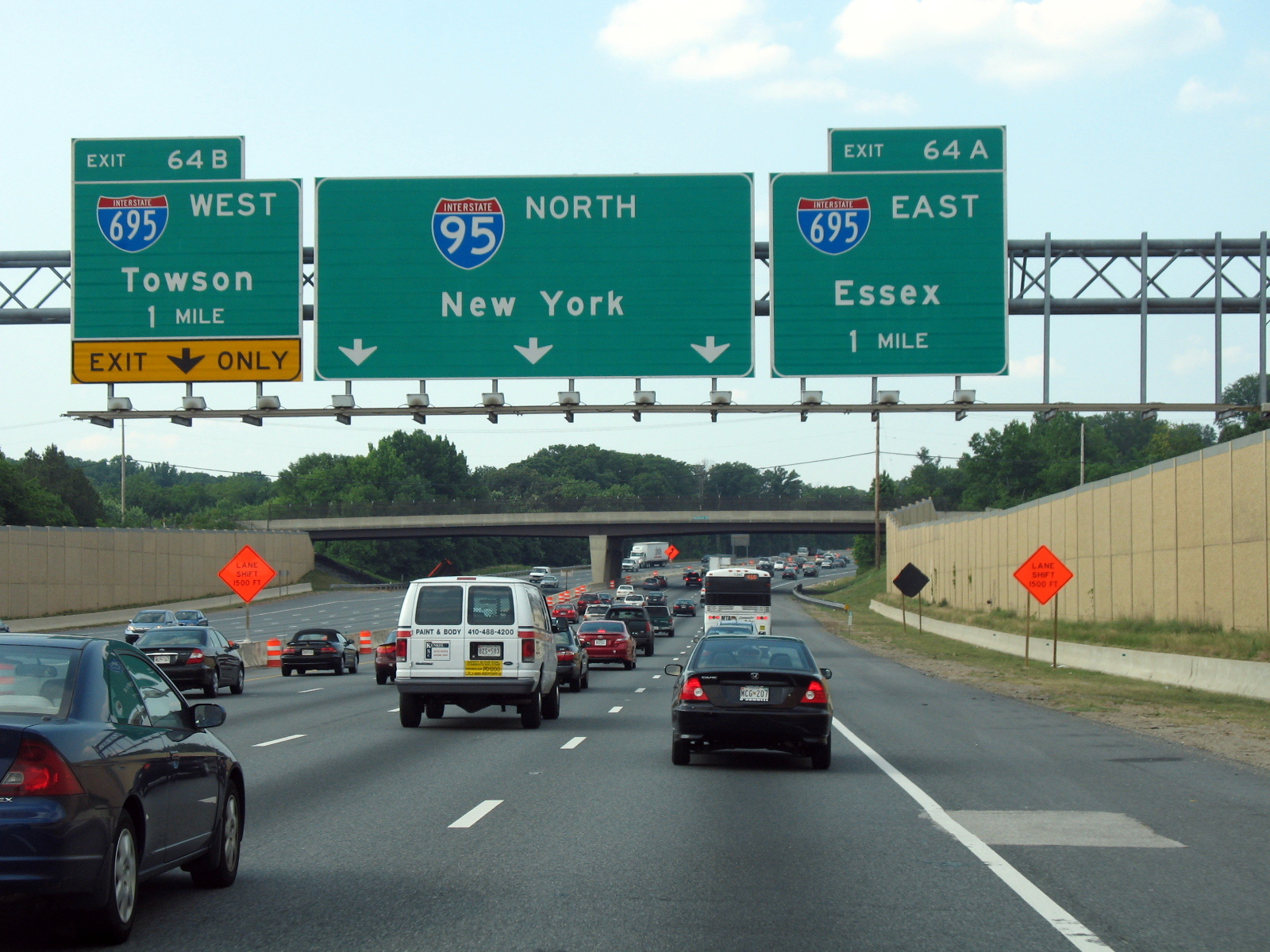
North of Baltimore, Maryland, New York City is used instead of closer Philadelphia or Wilmington.

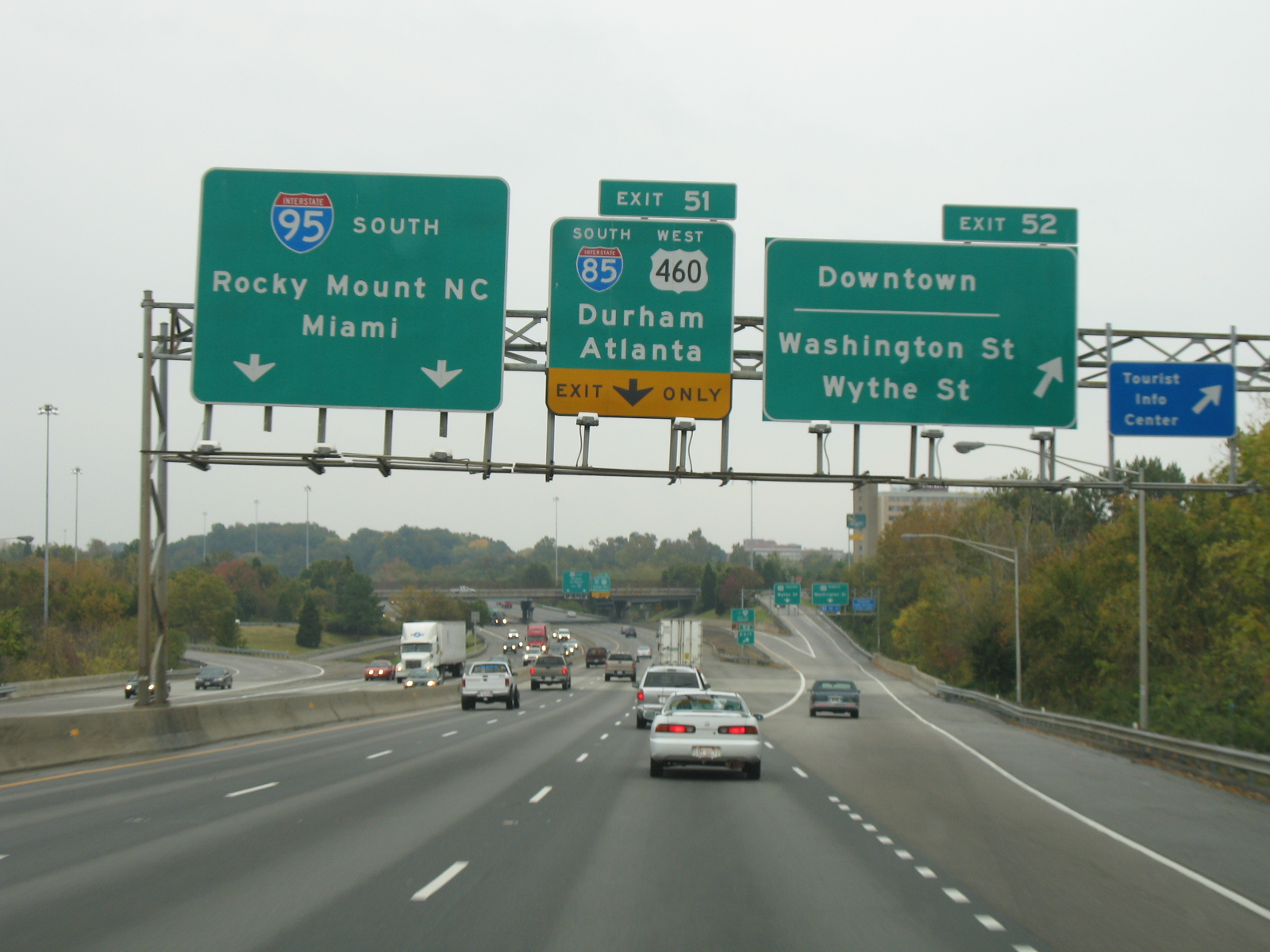
These signs in Petersburg, Virginia on Interstate 95 near the start of Interstate 85 aid long-distance travelers, by listing the cities of Durham, North Carolina, Rocky Mount, North Carolina, Miami, Florida, and Atlanta, Georgia.

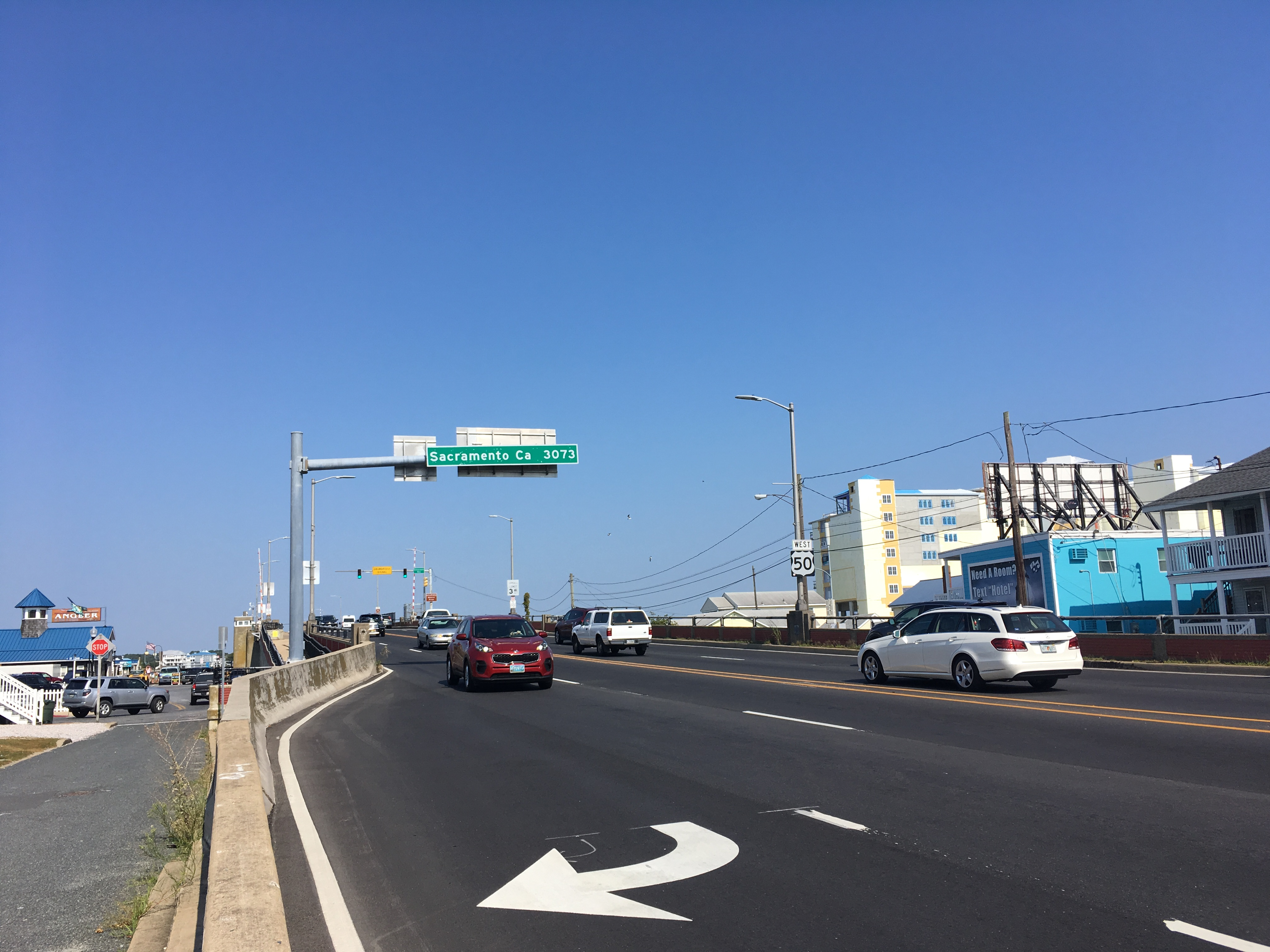
The eastbound terminus of U.S. Route 50 in Ocean City, Maryland is an unusual case, giving the distance to the very distant western terminus in Sacramento, California.

The control cities on the Interstate Highway network are selected by the states and contained in the "List of Control Cities for Use in Guide Signs on Interstate Highways," which is published by the American Association of State Highway and Transportation Officials as Part III of the AASHTO Guidelines for Supplemental Guide Signing. Control cities on other U.S. roads are often selected on the basis of general principles, as opposed to specific lists of towns.

U.S. federal lists are in practice not always followed. This may be the result of towns having gained importance since the list was last updated or in order to have local (intrastate) interests prevail over towns elsewhere. On the other hand, there are also instances where intrastate control cities have been left out so that long-distance focal points could be added. There are also instances where the name of another state has prevailed over the official control city, e.g. the signs in Boston heading to the state of Maine ("All Maine Points" appears twice on northbound I-95 just south of Portsmouth, NH.).

On the U.S. federal list, control cities have often been selected by virtue of being located close to an intersection of two US-interstates. This has resulted in a number of very minor localities having control city status. Some examples:

- Interstate 8 heading eastbound in California from its starting point in San Diego signs El Centro and Yuma as control cities until the Arizona state line. This may be due to the fact that there are no cities in California or Arizona with a population of more than 200,000 that are along the freeway besides the aforementioned San Diego. Conversely, however, its Arizona route only signs Phoenix and Tucson heading east, while San Diego is the only control city signed heading west. Phoenix lies significantly north of Interstate 8, but may be signed to aid travelers from San Diego to Arizona's capital and largest city. It is omitted after Exit 115 heading eastbound, from where only Tucson is signed until the freeway defaults onto eastbound Interstate 10 (which eventually reaches that city).
- Interstate 10 heading eastbound from its starting point to the California–Arizona state line uses the following towns as control cities: San Bernardino, Indio, and Blythe. Besides Exit 145 in Indio, there is no mention of Phoenix as a control city during this stretch of freeway despite it being the next city after San Bernardino with a population over 200,000. Conversely, Los Angeles is used as the westbound lanes’ control city as far as the eastern city limits of Phoenix until the East Los Angeles Interchange.
- Interstate 10 heading eastbound in El Paso uses Van Horn, Texas, a small city west of the western terminus of I-20; the junction of I-10 and US 90 is also near Van Horn. Both Van Horn and San Antonio are used, due to the latter being the next major city along the route.
- Interstate 10 in Louisiana uses Lake Charles and Lafayette as control cities in both directions. In Texas, Baton Rouge was previously listed as the eastbound control city beginning in Beaumont to the Texas-Louisiana state line. Recently updated signs now list Lake Charles as the eastbound control city starting in Beaumont at the request of the Louisiana Department of Transportation and Development.
- From New Orleans to the Louisiana-Mississippi state line, I-10 eastbound signs list the smaller communities of Slidell, Louisiana and Bay St. Louis, Mississippi as control cities, rather than Gulfport, one of the two largest cities (with Biloxi) along the Mississippi Gulf Coast, or Mobile, Alabama, the largest city on I-10 between New Orleans and Tallahassee, Florida.
- I-10 westbound from Mobile, Alabama to the Mississippi state line uses Pascagoula, Mississippi as the control city, even though Pascagoula is not directly on I-10. New Orleans is listed as the westbound control city for all 77 miles of I-10 in Mississippi.
- Interstate 49 in Louisiana uses Opelousas, a small city, as a control city northbound from Interstate 10 in Lafayette to the junction of I-49 and US 190, and southbound from Louisiana Highway 1 in Alexandria to US 190. US 190 is heavily traveled between Opelousas and Baton Rouge, even with the presence of I-10, probably the reason why Opelousas is listed as a control city.
- Interstate 55 heading northbound out of LaPlace, Louisiana uses Hammond, where it crosses Interstate 12. I-12 east from its origin in Baton Rouge to I-55 uses Hammond as the control city, as does I-12 west from its ending at the I-10/Interstate 59 junction in Slidell to I-55. Hammond's use is likely due to its location of Southeastern Louisiana University, the state's third largest public university.
  - On Interstate 55 south in Mississippi, all signs south of Jackson list New Orleans as the control city.
- Interstate 40 in Arizona uses Flagstaff eastbound from the California state line to the junction of I-40 and Interstate 17, and westbound from the New Mexico state line to I-17. This is because Flagstaff is I-17's northern terminus; I-17 north from Phoenix uses Flagstaff for the same reason as well. Flagstaff is also the gateway to the Grand Canyon National Park.
- Prior to the completion of I-69 within southern Indiana, northbound approaches south of Bloomington did not have any control city. Instead they simply read "I-69 North". North of Bloomington, however, Indianapolis was used as a control city. This is due to this section of I-69 having been initially built as part of State Road 37, which had Indianapolis as a northbound control city. The entire interstate does currently use Evansville as the control city on the southbound approaches.
  - Likewise in Kentucky, I-69 uses Henderson as a control city due to the fact of the highway currently dead-ending there.
- Interstate 70 in Missouri often uses several intermediate towns between the large cities at opposite ends of the state along the highway, Kansas City and St. Louis. Columbia is most commonly listed due to its central location within the state and the presence of the state's flagship university, the University of Missouri.
  - In the St. Louis area, Indianapolis is not listed as a control city on eastbound I-70 until the highway crosses into Illinois. Also, Louisville is not listed as a control city on I-64 eastbound until entering Illinois. St. Louis is the control city on I-64 westbound beginning in Louisville, and I-70 westbound beginning in Indianapolis. Once in St. Louis, westbound I-64's control city becomes Wentzville, I-64's national western terminus.
    - Additionally, signs in the St. Louis area do not advise travelers of the more direct route to Louisville, which is to remain on I-70 until its junction with I-64 in East St. Louis, Illinois. This has been the case since the opening of the Stan Musial Veterans Memorial Bridge in February 2014.
  - In the Kansas City area, Topeka is not listed as a control city on westbound I-70 in Kansas City, Missouri until the highway enters the Downtown Loop. Conversely, St. Louis is listed as the control city on eastbound I-70 beginning with the junction at Interstate 435 in Kansas City, Kansas.
- Interstate 55 in Missouri also uses intermediate cities as control cities, notably Cape Girardeau, the largest city along the route between St. Louis and Memphis. Most I-55 northbound signs in Tennessee and Arkansas list St. Louis as the control city.
- Limon, Colorado (population 2,043 as of the 2020 census) is listed as a control city along I-70 eastbound starting in Denver, and westbound starting at the Colorado-Kansas state line. For a brief time, Limon was also used as a control city for 253 miles of I-70 in Kansas westbound from Salina to the state line. The control cities are now Hays from mile markers 253 to 161, and Denver from mile marker 161 to the Colorado state line.
- Interstate 75 in Michigan uses the Mackinac Bridge as a control point between St. Ignace and Saginaw.
- The Pennsylvania Turnpike (I-70/76) and PA Route 66 use New Stanton, Pennsylvania as a control city, due to the fact that it is at PA 66's terminus as well as the western end of I-70's concurrency with I-76 on the turnpike. Additionally, Breezewood is used as a control city on westbound I-70 north of Hancock, Maryland, due to a freeway gap in downtown Breezewood where the highway joins the Pennsylvania Turnpike.
- Interstate 77 in Ohio signs the small in-state city of Marietta (population 13,385 at the 2020 census) south of Akron instead of Charleston, West Virginia, the state capital which is almost four times larger (population 48,864 at the 2020 census) than Marietta.
- Interstate 80 in Des Moines mostly lists Iowa cities on the state's borders, Council Bluffs westbound and Davenport eastbound, although some newer signs list larger out-of-state cities Omaha westbound and Chicago eastbound.
- Interstate 84 in Oregon heading eastbound from Portland uses The Dalles, Pendleton, LaGrande, Baker City, and Ontario as control cities. Boise, Idaho isn't signed until the freeway reaches Ontario.
  - Going westbound from Pendleton, Portland becomes the control city on I-84, skipping over The Dalles.
- Interstate 94 in Michigan uses Marshall, Michigan as a control city between Battle Creek and Jackson.

However, in many other instances, the next major city near or along the route is used as a control city, often skipping over minor localities where two US-interstates meet. For instance:

- Interstate 10 in Arizona heading eastbound from Tucson to the New Mexico state line uses El Paso, Texas as a control city and skips over Las Cruces, New Mexico, a smaller city (compared to El Paso) where the southern terminus of I-25 is located.
- Interstate 40 in Arizona heading westbound from Flagstaff uses Los Angeles as a control city instead of Barstow, California (the western terminus of I-40 at I-15) or Kingman, Arizona. I-15 uses Los Angeles as a control city heading southbound from Las Vegas as well. I-40 and I-15 do not go anywhere near Los Angeles, but the use of it as a control city on both I-40 and I-15 is probably a holdover from the days when the routes were US 66 (the western terminus was in Santa Monica), and US 91 (whose southern terminus was in Long Beach, a city close to Los Angeles) respectively, as well as the fact that most of the California bound traffic on I-40 and I-15 are headed to the Los Angeles area.
- Interstate 20 in Texas heading westbound from Midland–Odessa to its western terminus at Interstate 10 uses El Paso as a control city, as does I-10 west from San Antonio. I-20 does not travel all the way to El Paso, as it merges into I-10 near Kent.
- Interstate 8 in Arizona uses Tucson as a control city eastbound from Yuma to Casa Grande, where it defaults onto Interstate 10. Phoenix is also used but between Yuma and Gila Bend; this is because travelers headed to Phoenix take AZ 85 from Gila Bend to I-10.
- Interstate 57 within Illinois uses Chicago as a control city northbound (skipping over Champaign and Urbana, where it meets I-72 and I-74), while Memphis is used as a control city southbound. I-57 does not travel all the way to Memphis, as it merges into I-55 near Sikeston, Missouri.
- Interstate 84 east from Hartford to its terminus at the Massachusetts Turnpike (I-90) near Sturbridge, Massachusetts uses Boston.
- Interstate 90 in Washington does not use Ellensburg (where it meets I-82) as a control city between Spokane and Seattle.
- Interstate 5 in Washington uses Portland, Oregon as the southbound control city from Seattle to the Oregon state line (skipping over Tacoma and Olympia).
- Interstate 80 in Ohio heading eastbound from Youngstown uses New York City as a control city instead of the 10 listed municipalities in Pennsylvania and the Delaware Water Gap.

Some beltways or spurs which run through multiple states have different rules on control cities in each state. One instance is Interstate 435, the beltway in the Kansas City Metropolitan Area. Signs for I-435 in Kansas do not have control cities listed, while in Missouri, one of five control cities is listed, depending upon direction and location: Des Moines, St. Joseph, St. Louis, Topeka and Wichita.

According to Section 2E.07 of the Manual on Uniform Traffic Control Devices, control cities must appear on guide signs:

1. At interchanges between freeways (example US-1 in gallery)
2. At separation points of overlapping freeway routes (example US-2 in gallery)
3. On directional signs on intersecting routes, to guide traffic entering the freeway (example US-3 in gallery)
4. On pull-through signs (example US-4 in gallery)
5. On the bottom line of post-interchange distance signs (example US-5 in gallery)

Since the cities on post-interchange distance signs are listed in ascending order of distance, the control city of routes in the United States is typically the most distant locality on the signs of a particular road.

== Oceania ==
=== Australia ===
While the term 'control city' is not often used, highways, motorways and freeways in Australia operate on much the same system as in the United States and Europe. Directional markers are not used, instead the next large towns or cities which are likely to be the destination, or known waypoints for motorists, are used.

- Within cities major suburbs will usually be used - In the eastern suburbs of Melbourne Chadstone and Dandenong, which are connecting hubs with the national route 1, Princes Highway, are used as route markers, and other roads may consistently rely on specific outer suburbs such as Lilydale or Ringwood for Maroondah Highway or Montrose or Vermont for Canterbury Road. Traveling inbound, depending upon the driver's location in Melbourne's east one of these markers will generally be used along with a marker 'City' referring to the Central Business District. The marker 'City' is only used when within the metropolitan area of a city, outside of the metropolitan area routes traveling towards that city will use the city's full name. Perth uses 'Perth City'.
- Outside of cities, major regional centers or capital cities will generally be used as markers.
- The same principle applies to major and secondary surface roads in Australia, with the most major suburb or town, or the road's terminus in either direction being used as the 'control city'. On the main routes connecting Australia's major cities, the next interstate capital is often used signposted in addition to the next regional centre. The Northern Queensland town of Cairns has a similar status.
- In some circumstances a major infrastructure location, most often Airports, will be used as a destination. In the case of surface roads if they connect to a freeway, motorway or tollway sometimes this connection will be used as a signing point.

VicRoads' Traffic Engineering Manual, Vol 2 part 2.15, pp. 185-209, defined the standard through destinations (as of the publication date) for the freeways and arterial roads in Victoria in map form

== Guidelines to control city selection ==
There is no absolute threshold of community size or distance away, or absolute necessity that it has to be a city per se in order to be selected. Even some highways will terminate several miles before the so-called "control city" and "borrow" another route to continue toward there, even if a north–south highway has to externalize its control city to an east–west highway (or vice versa).

For instance, Interstate 75 in Michigan uses the Mackinac Bridge as a "control city", and even U.S. Route 127 in Michigan does it as far south as Mt. Pleasant. Another idiosyncrasy with control cities is there is no absolute rule that the city has to be reached before the control city changes, for instance Interstate 94 in Michigan uses Chicago as a control city as far as the Metro Detroit area, whereas some in-between cities such as Jackson are used within 20 miles (32 km) of there. Other control cities are used where a city can be several miles east of a north–south route, such as U.S. Route 35 using Charleston, West Virginia, as a control city even though the southern junction is at Scott Depot, West Virginia, in which Interstate 64 goes east toward Charleston. Another example is Interstate 65, as Chicago, Illinois is used as a control city north of Indianapolis, Indiana, but I-65 terminates at Interstate 90 and the Indiana Toll Road in Gary, Indiana, 26 miles southeast of Downtown Chicago, and I-90 goes northwest into Chicago via the Toll Road, Chicago Skyway Bridge and Dan Ryan Expressway. In the case of concurrencies, another control city from the overlapping highway can take over, and sometimes two locations are used together.

== Gallery ==
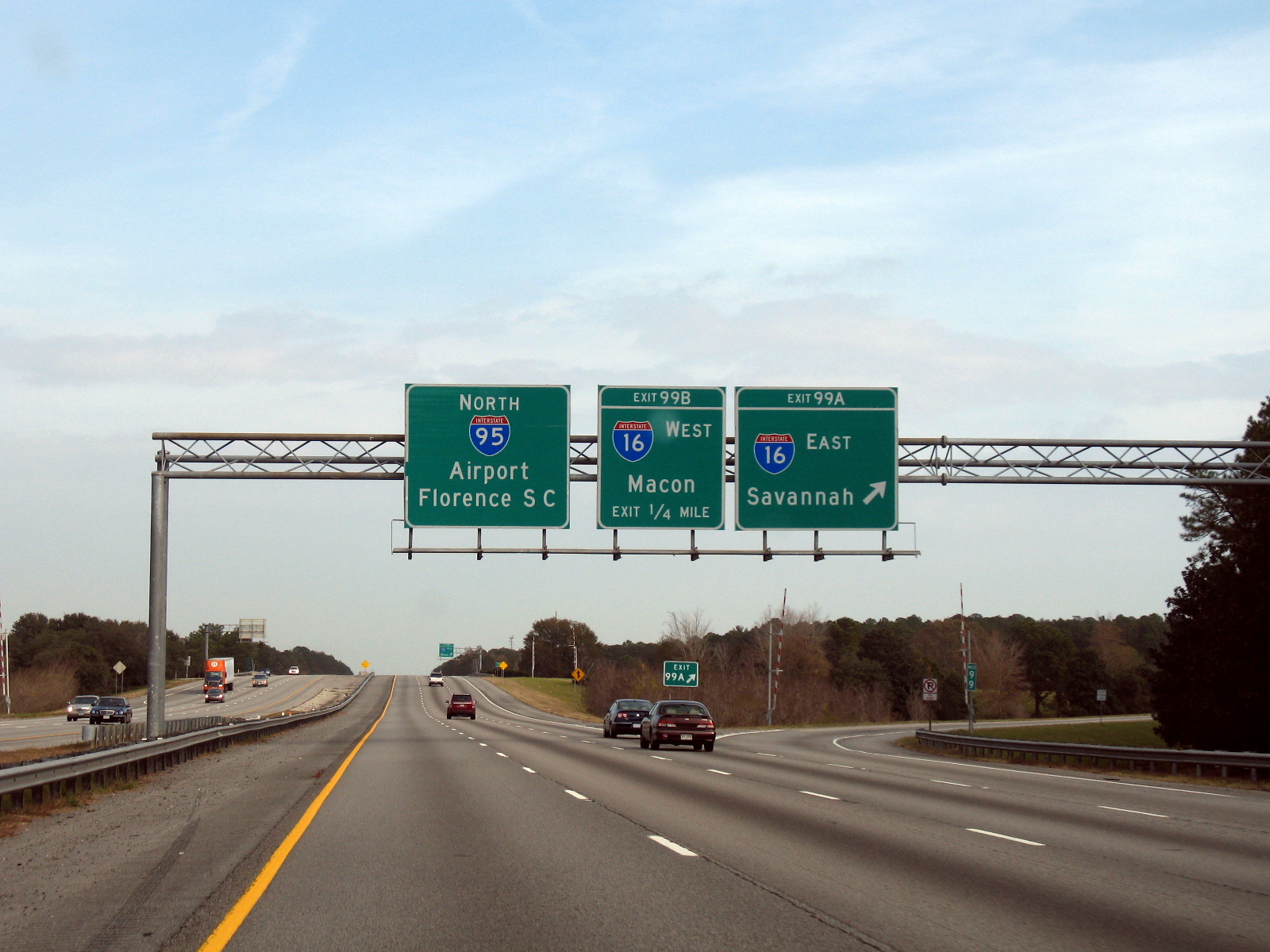
I-95 and I-16 intersect.

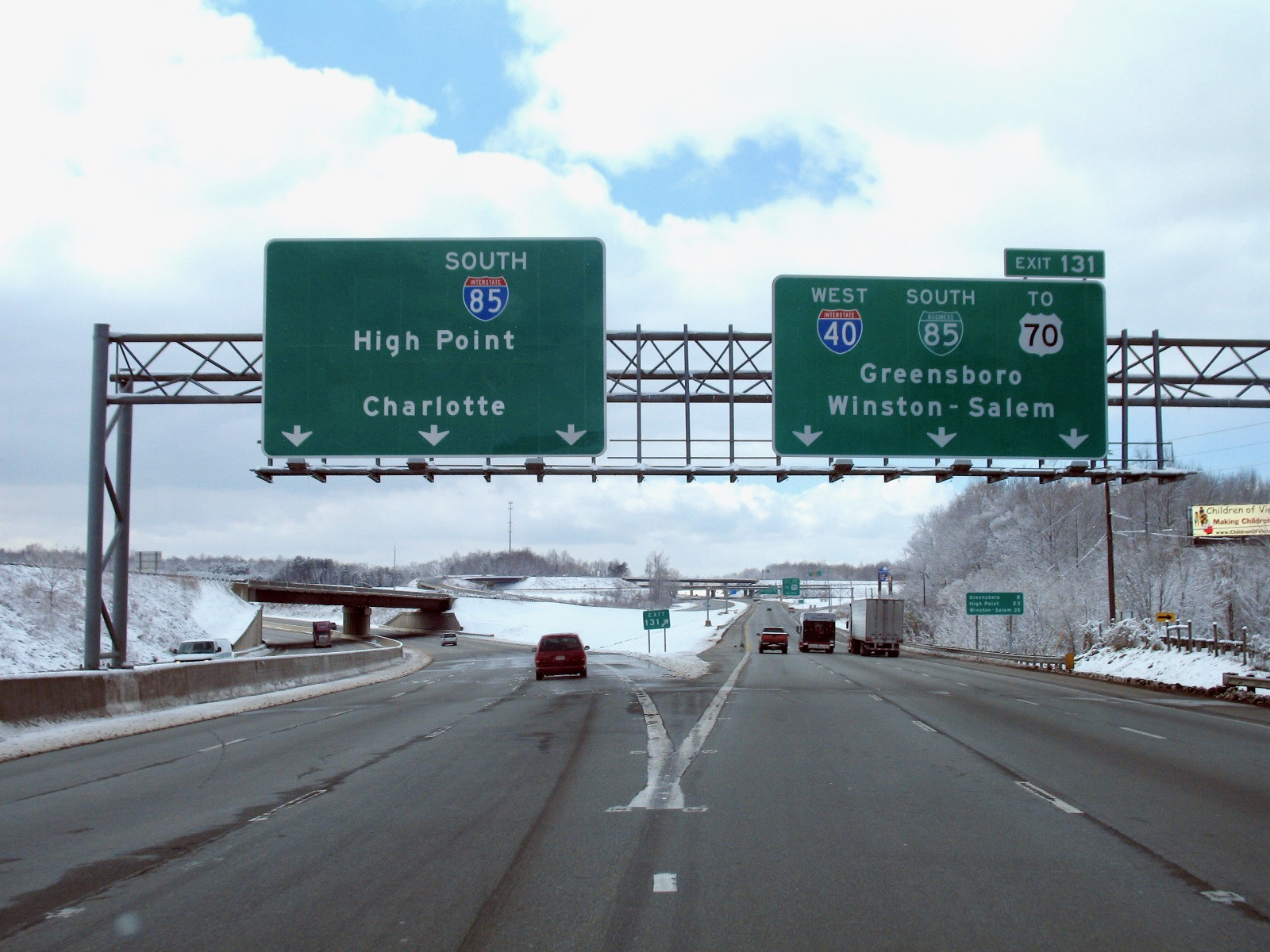
I-40 and I-85 split. I-40 travels through Greensboro to Winston-Salem, while I-85 heads south to Charlotte.

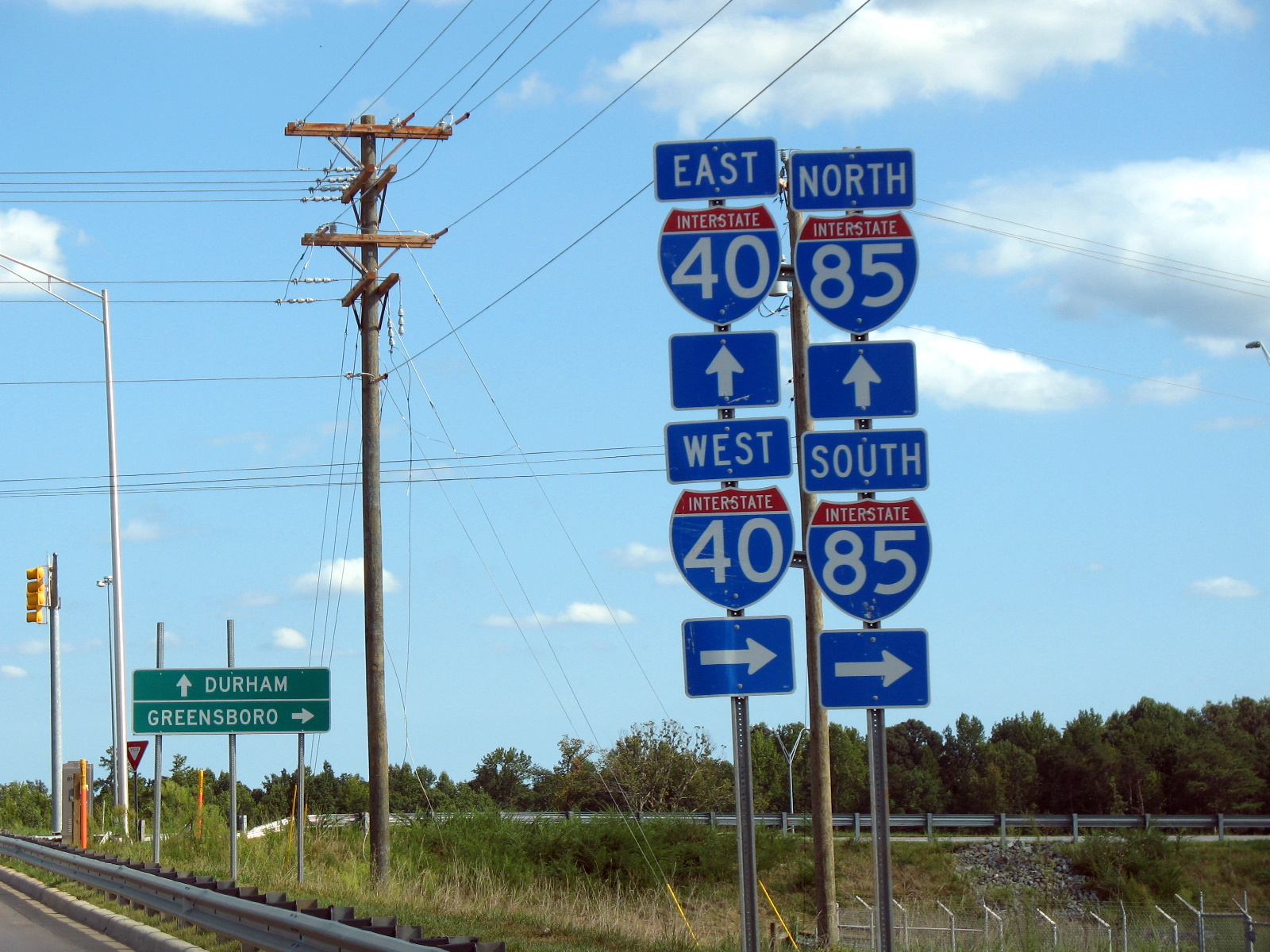
Durham and Greensboro are used to aid motorists in deciding which direction to travel in.

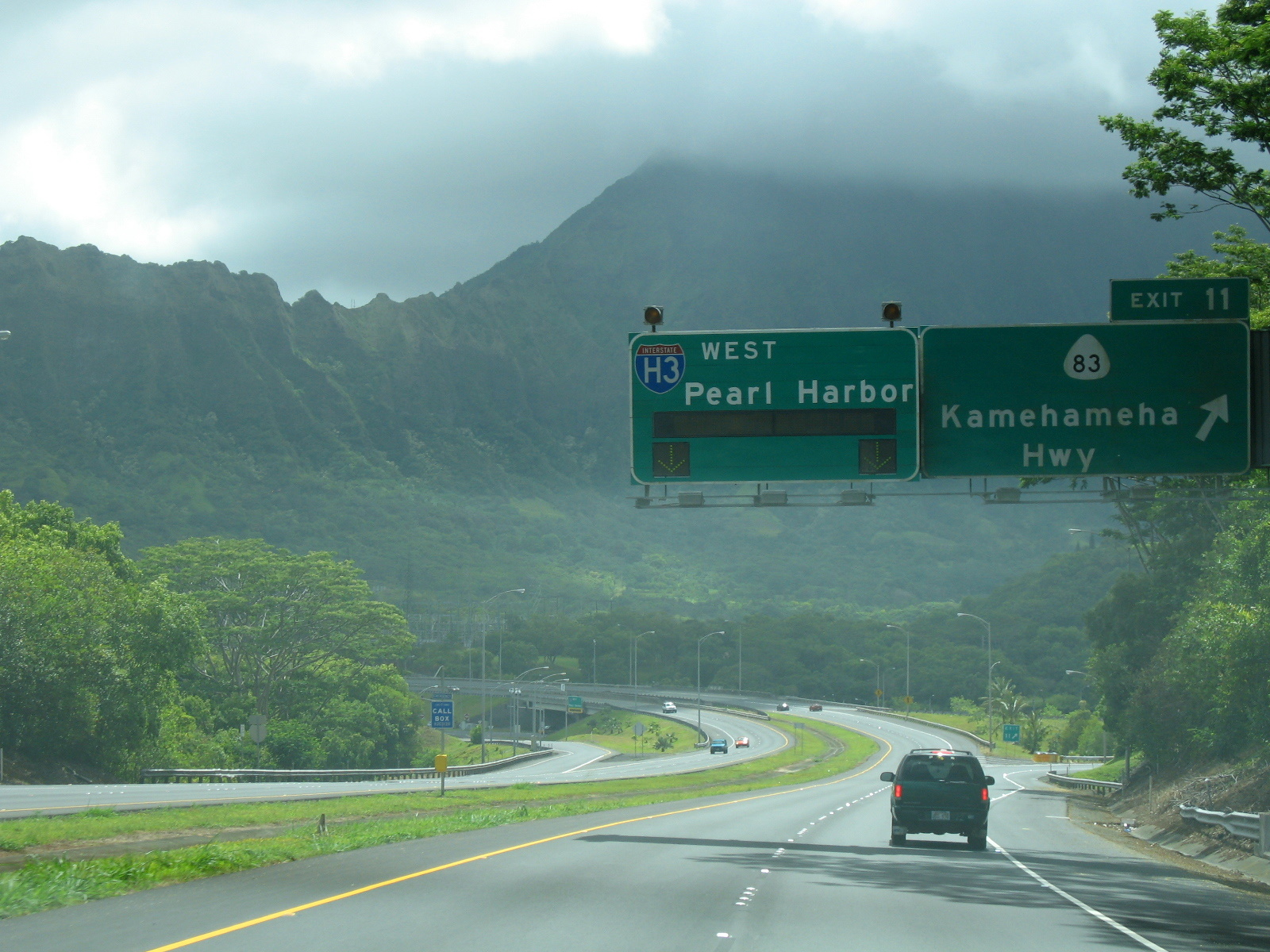
H-3 westbound uses "Pearl Harbor".

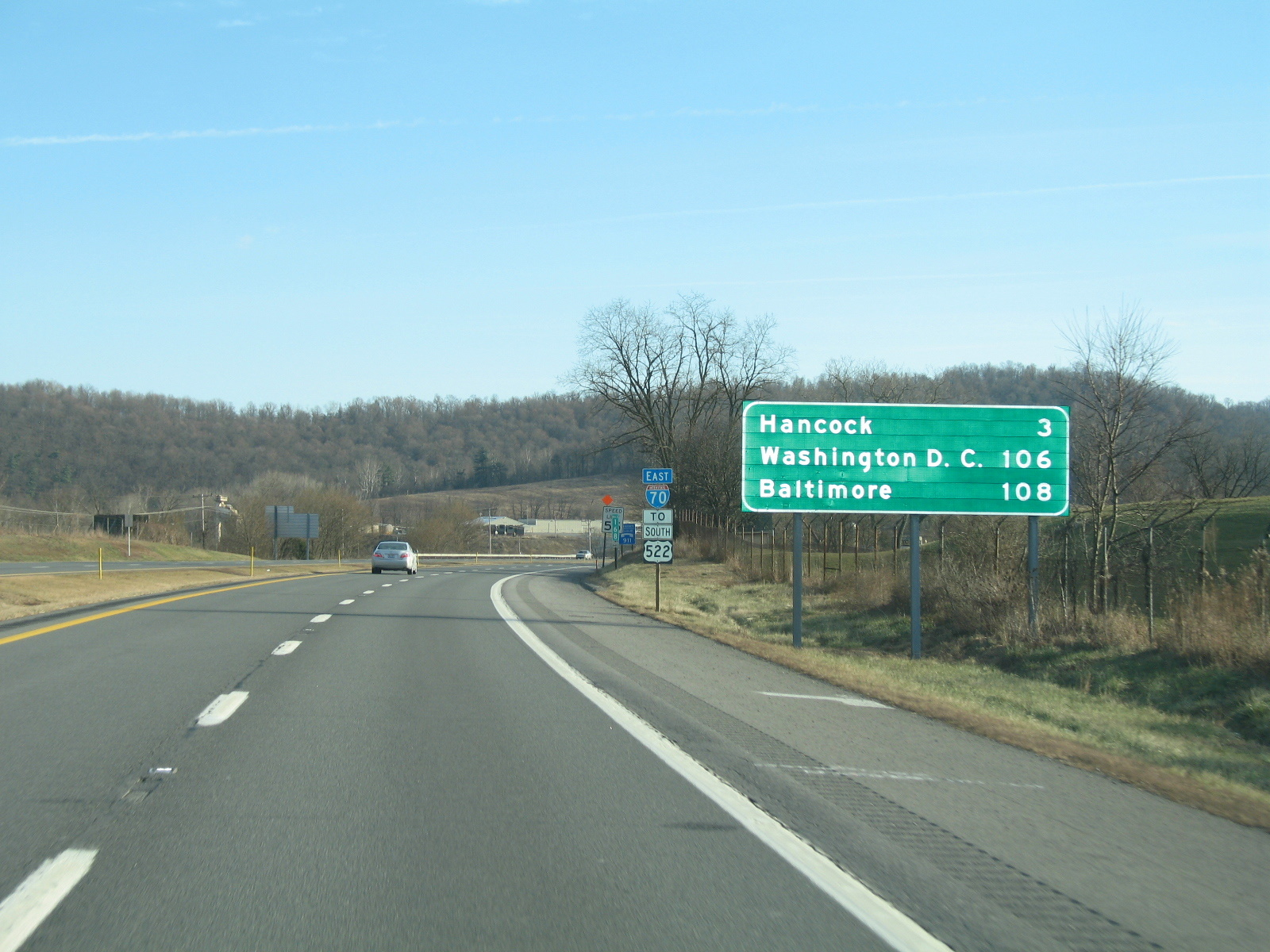
Baltimore is the major control city on I-70 eastbound through Maryland, while Washington, DC is a major city of interest. (This sign is located in Pennsylvania in close proximity to the Maryland border.)
