= Breza, Bjelovar-Bilogora County =

Breza
- Village
- Location within Croatia
- Coordinates: 45°52′N 16°43′E
- Country: Croatia
- County: Bjelovar-Bilogora County
- Municipality: Bjelovar

Area
  - Total: 1.3 sq mi (3.3 km^{2})

Population (2021)
  - Total: 135
  - Density: 110/sq mi (41/km^{2})
- Time zone: UTC+1 (CET)
  - Summer (DST): UTC+2 (CEST)

Breza is a village in Croatia.

== Demographics ==
According to the 2021 census, its population was 135. It was 102 in 2011.
