= Kloštar Vojakovački =

Coordinates: 46°03′N 16°37′E

- Village
- Interactive map of Kloštar Vojakovački
- Country: Croatia
- County: Koprivnica-Križevci County

Area
  - Total: 12.4 km^{2} (4.8 sq mi)

Population (2021)
  - Total: 318
  - Density: 25.6/km^{2} (66.4/sq mi)
- Time zone: UTC+1 (CET)
  - Summer (DST): UTC+2 (CEST)

Kloštar Vojakovački is a village in Croatia.
