= Boraja =

Settlement in Šibenik-Knin County, Croatia

- Settlement
- Interactive map of Boraja
- Location of Boraja in Croatia
- Coordinates: 43°37′47″N 16°04′56″E
- Country: Croatia
- County: Šibenik-Knin
- City: Šibenik

Area
  - Total: 13.7 km^{2} (5.3 sq mi)

Population (2021)
  - Total: 221
  - Density: 16.1/km^{2} (41.8/sq mi)
- Time zone: UTC+1 (CET)
  - Summer (DST): UTC+2 (CEST)
- Postal code: 22000 Šibenik
- Area code: +385 (0)22

Boraja is a settlement in the City of Šibenik in Croatia. In 2021, its population was 221.

== Demographics ==
Boraja: Population trends 1857–2021
v

population	655	633	309	361	373	477	325	457	466	574	548	549	403	293	247	249	221
	1857	1869	1880	1890	1900	1910	1921	1931	1948	1953	1961	1971	1981	1991	2001	2011	2021

Sources: Croatian Bureau of Statistics publications
