= D58 road =

Road in Croatia

D58 state road

Route information
- Length: 43.0 km (26.7 mi)

Major junctions
- From: Šibenik (port)
- D8 near Šibenik; D531 near Vrpolje interchange
- To: D8 in Trogir

Location
- Country: Croatia
- Counties: Šibenik-Knin, Split-Dalmatia
- Major cities: Šibenik, Trogir

Highway system
- Highways in Croatia

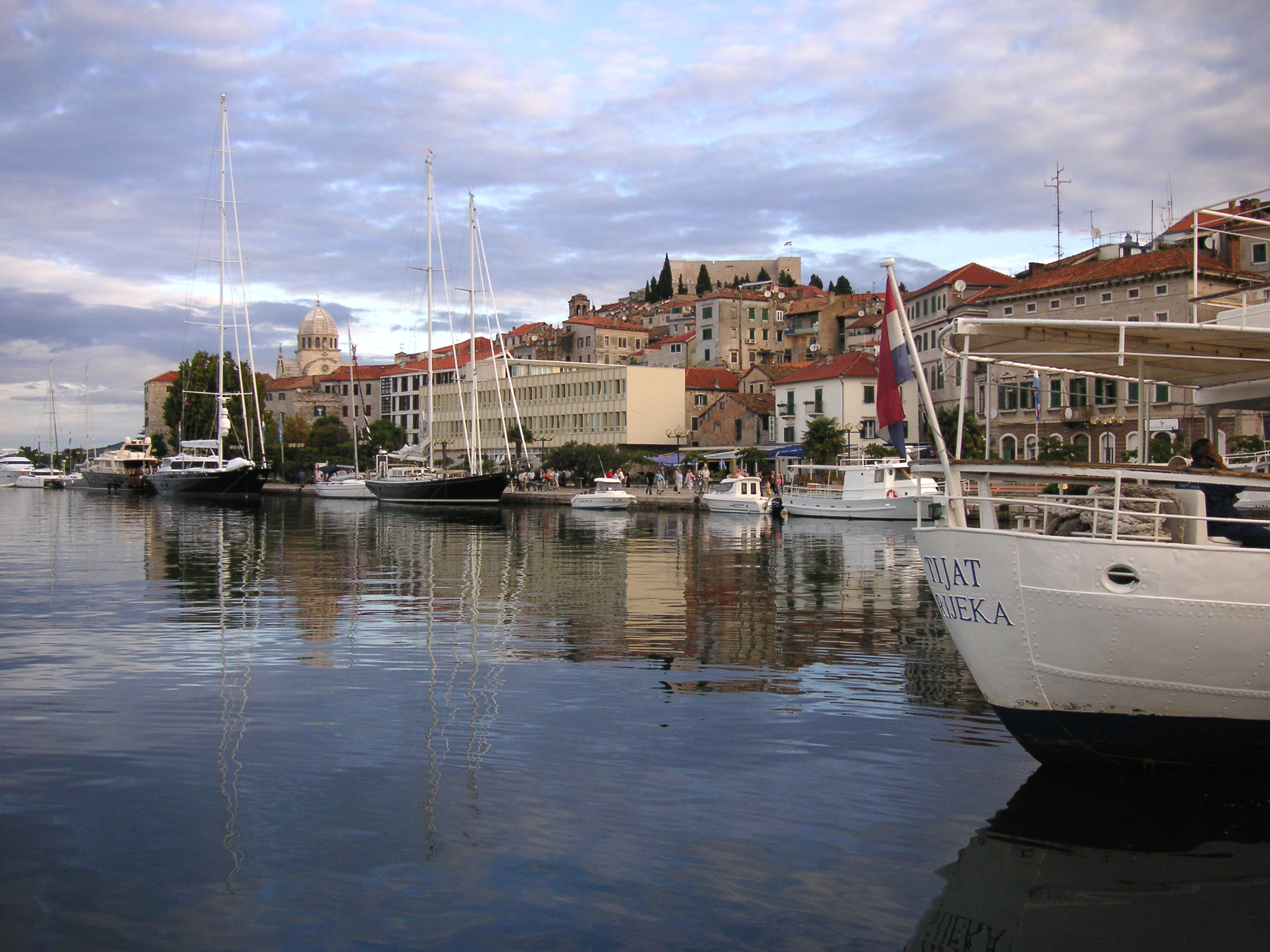
Šibenik, at the western terminus of the D58 road

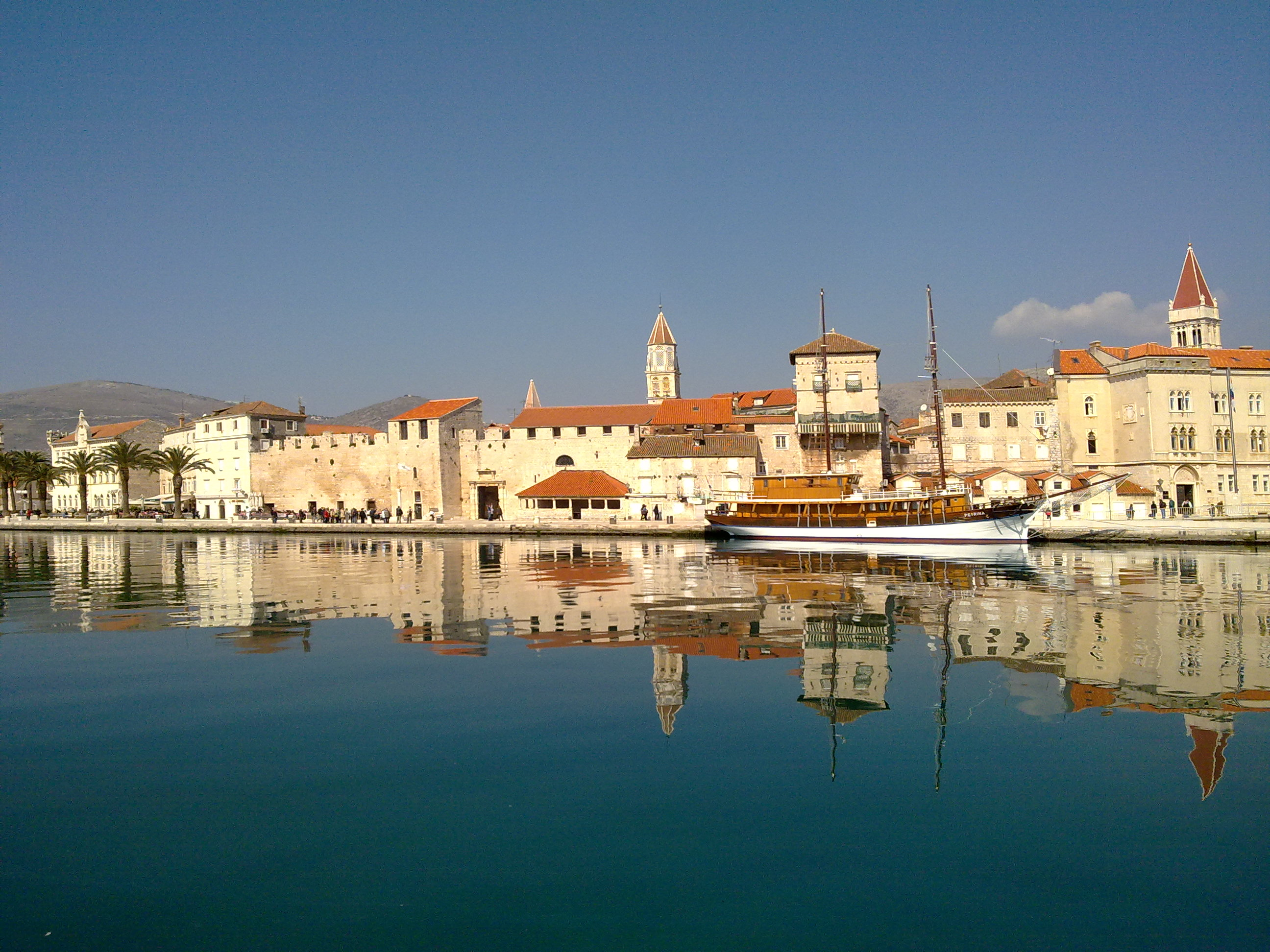
Trogir, at the eastern terminus of the D58 road

D58 is a state road in the central Dalmatia region of Croatia that provides access from the A1 motorway's Vrpolje interchange to the D8 state road, facilitating access from A1 motorway to Šibenik, Trogir and surrounding seaside resorts. The road is 43.0 km (26.7 mi) long.

The western terminus of the road is located in Šibenik port, near an interchange to the D8 state road. At its eastern terminus, the road connects once more to the D8 state road which serves as a parallel road to the D8 between Šibenik and Trogir, connecting to Rogoznica and Primošten.

The road, as well as all other state roads in Croatia, is managed and maintained by Hrvatske ceste, a state-owned company.

== Traffic volume ==
Traffic is regularly counted and reported by Hrvatske ceste, operator of the road. Substantial variations between annual (AADT) and summer (ASDT) traffic volumes are attributed to the fact that the road serves as a D8 bypass, especially during summer season congestions.

D58 traffic volume
Road	Counting site	AADT	ASDT	Notes
D58	5320 Vrpolje west	4,290	4,725	Adjacent to Ž6108 junction.
D58	5406 Donji Seget	3,173	4,567	Adjacent to D8 junction (Trogir).

== Road junctions ==
D58 major junctions/populated areas
Type	Slip roads/Notes
	Šibenik Port; The western terminus of the road.
	Šibenik; Ž6106 to D33 state road through Šibenik.
	D8 to Vodice and Rogoznica.
	Ž6108 to Jadrtovac.
	Donje Polje
	Vrpolje; Ž6109 to Ž6091 county road.
	D531 to A1 motorway Vrpolje interchange - to Šibenik and Zadar to the north, and to Split to the south.
	Čuklini
	Boraja
	Kneževići
	Ljubitovica
	Prapatnica; Ž6112 to Prgomet.
	Ž6129 to Bristvica and Blizna Donja.
	Seget Donji
	D8 to Marina and Kaštela. The eastern terminus of the road.
