= Novi Varoš =

Coordinates: 45°12′N 17°13′E

- Village
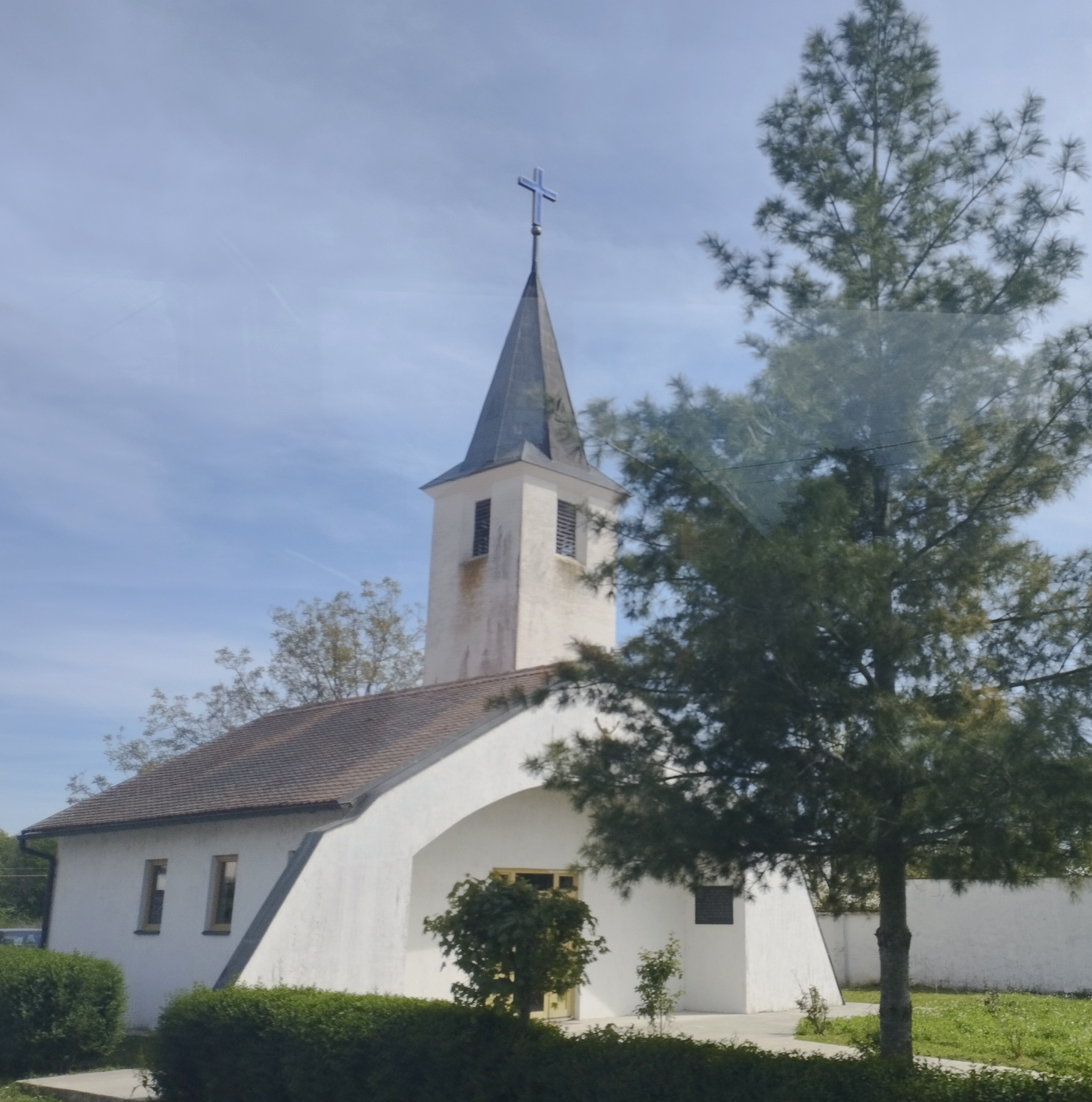
- Interactive map of Novi Varoš
- Country: Croatia
- County: Brod-Posavina County
- Municipality: Stara Gradiška

Area
  - Total: 14.5 km^{2} (5.6 sq mi)

Population (2021)
  - Total: 113
  - Density: 7.79/km^{2} (20.2/sq mi)
- Time zone: UTC+1 (CET)
  - Summer (DST): UTC+2 (CEST)

Novi Varoš is a village in Croatia. It is connected by the D5 highway.
