= D126 road =

Road in Croatia

D126 state road

Route information
- Length: 8.3 km (5.2 mi)

Major junctions
- From: D315 in Trogir
- To: Slatine

Location
- Country: Croatia
- Counties: Split-Dalmatia

Highway system
- Highways in Croatia

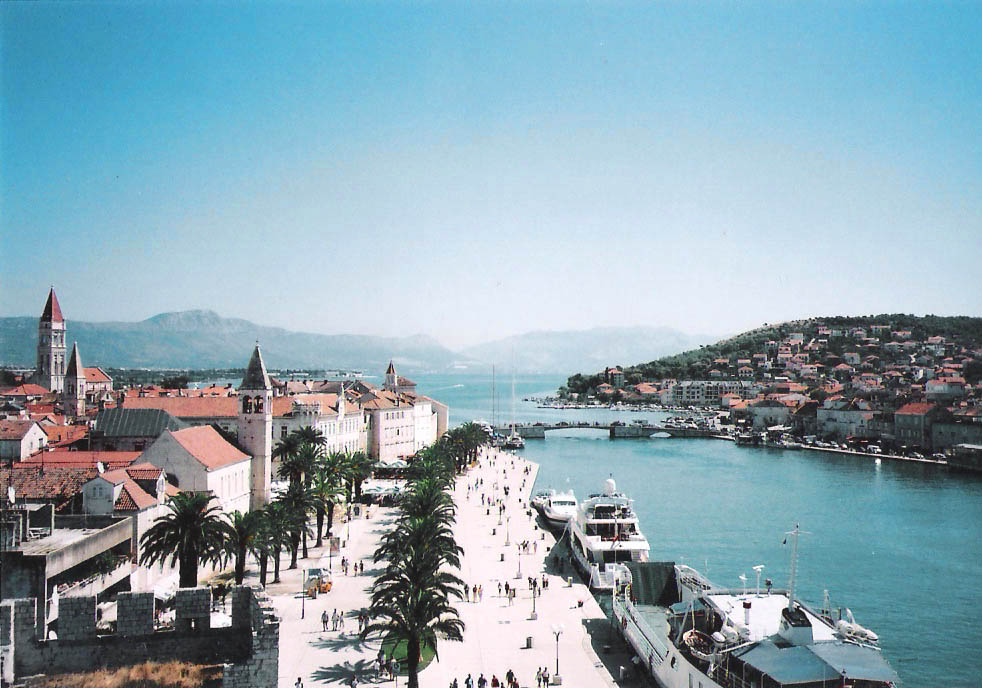
Trogir, at the northern terminus of the D126 road, the Čiovo Bridge is visible

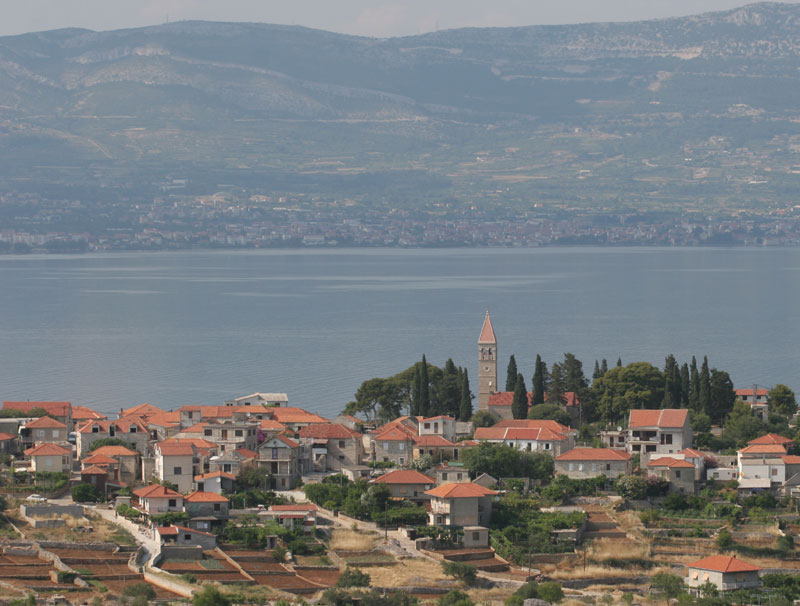
Slatine, at the southern terminus of the D126 road

D315 is a state road branching off from D409 state road connecting it to Trogir. The road is 8.3 km (5.2 mi) long.

In Trogir, the road crosses from the mainland to Čiovo Island via a movable bridge. A new movable bridge is planned to be completed outside the city centre, and at such time, the D126 route is expected to be relocated as well. The construction appears to be delayed though.

The road, as well as all other state roads in Croatia, is managed and maintained by Hrvatske ceste, a state-owned company.

== Road junctions ==
D126 junctions
Type	Slip roads/Notes
	Trogir; D315 to Pantana and Split and to Ž6133 and Ž6134 county roads to D8 state road. Ž6134 to Okrug Gornji. The northern terminus of the road.
	Mastrinka
	Ž6135 to Žedno.
	Arbanija
	Slatine; The southern terminus of the road.
