= Raid on Šolta =

- Part of World War II in Yugoslavia
Date	9–11 May 1944
Location	Šolta and the waters around Vis
Result	German victory

Belligerents
Germany	Partisans

Units involved
264th Division; 892th Regiment; 3rd Company; 7th Company	26th Division; 1st Brigade; 12th Brigade; 3rd Battalion; Supported by: Allied air and naval assets

Strength
2 companies (initially); 3 companies (later) c. 400 troops (total); 2 E-boats	5 infantry battalions c. 20 vessels

Casualties and losses
100+ killed, wounded or captured 1 landing craft sunk 1 landing-assault craft damaged	97 killed 82 wounded 1 hospital ship sunk
- 6 civilians killed

The raid on Šolta (Serbo-Croatian: Desantni prepad na Šoltu) was an amphibious raid carried out by the Yugoslav Partisans on 10 May 1944 against the German garrison on the central-Dalmatian island of Šolta. By late 1943/early 1944, the majority of the Dalmatian islands were occupied by German Forces, the exception being Vis which soon became a Partisan and Allied stronghold from which they would launch raids against German island garrisons. Following the highly successful raid on Korčula a month earlier, the Partisans decided to stage their next attack on the strategically important island of Šolta occupied by the Germans since January 1944. The Partisans planned on landing a reinforced brigade on two locations on the island, followed by an assault on German positions with the help of artillery and Allied air support, overrunning them and retreating to Vis.

Despite landing on the island during the night, the element of surprise was lost early on when German Forces observed the Partisan convoys approaching Šolta, leading them to call for additional reinforcements from Split. The outcome of the raid was also marked by the failure of the Partisan intelligence to correctly determine the exact disposition of the German Forces as well as the strength of their foritifications which have been upgraded in response to the earlier raids. As the planned Allied bombing had little effect in softening German defences and after several unsuccessful attacks on the heavily fortified bulk of the German Forces, the Partisans retreated to Vis, having sustained 40 killed and over a hundred wounded.

In response to the raid, the German launched an air raid on Vis while three Kriegsmarine torpedo boats were dispatched to the waters surrounding the island where they encountered a Partisan hospital ship transporting the wounded from Šolta. The boats proceeded to sink it, resulting in a Partisan death toll that exceeded the number of those who were killed in the raid itself. Following the raid, the Partisan Headquarters commended the troops which took part in the raid, but were critical of the circumstances and reactions surrounding the sinking of Marin II. Šolta itself remained occupied until late September 1944 when it was liberated by Partisan and Allied Forces after a brief skirmish with the retreating Germans.

== Background ==
Following the Invasion of Yugoslavia in April 1941, the defeated Kingdom of Yugoslavia was partitioned among the Axis powers. The Dalmatian coast and its islands were divided between the Kingdom of Italy and the newly-formed puppet state of Independent State of Croatia (Croatian: Nezavisna država Hrvatska – NDH). On 23 April, forces of Royal Italian Army landed on Brač, Hvar, Korčula, Vis and Šolta and in May, the Treaties of Rome were signed, stipulating that Brač and Hvar will become part of the NDH while all other Dalmatian islands will be ceded to the Kingdom of Italy. After the Italian surrender in September 1943, the Yugoslav Partisans began disarming Italian Forces and taking control of areas previously occupied by the Royal Italian Army, capturing a large quantity of war materiel in the process. The Partisans were successful in capturing almost the entire Dalmatian coastline and its islands, prompting German Forces to retake them in fear of a possible Allied amphibious landing. The cities of Zadar, Šibenik and Dubrovnik were quickly captured followed by Split on 27 September.

At the end of October, Axis Forces launched a major offensive against the 8th Corps of the Yugoslav Partisans with the goal of securing the entire Dalmatian coast, starting with a landing on Pelješac. After heavy fighting and sustaining heavy casualties, the Partisans retreated to Korčula. German Forces continued their advance and on 22 December landed on Korčula. In the ensuing fighting the Partisans again suffered heavy losses: the 18th Dalmatian Brigade lost half of its manpower between 22 and 23 December, the 1st Overseas Brigade sustained over 300 casualties while the commander of the 26th Division Nikola Martinović was killed in action. The Partisans began their retreat to Hvar and Vis on the night of 24 December, completing it by 26/27 December. In the aftermath of the fighting on Korčula, the Partisans assessed that the Axis numerical and technological advantage was too great for them to organize a defense of all of the remaining central-Dalmatian islands of Brač, Hvar and Šolta. Instead, it was decided to retreat all forces from those islands to Vis, fortify it and defend it with the help of Allied Forces. The retreat was completed between 1–3 January 1944, leaving behind only light forces. During the night of 12/13 January, 300 German troops of the 264th Infantry Division landed on Šolta, securing the island after s single day of light fighting.

By late January 1944, Partisan and Allied Forces stationed on Vis began performing raids against German garrisons on the recently occupied islands. The first such raid occurred on 27 January when 70 British commandos landed on Hvar, and with the help of the Hvar Partisan Detachment, attacked the Germans in the village of Milna. Several more successful raids on Hvar followed, prompting the Germans to abandon their positions on the western part of the island and focus on the eastern part around Sućuraj. On 18 March, British commandos of No. 2 Commando and 43 Commando RM supported by 36 Royal Air Force P-40 Kittyhawks launched a raid on Šolta codenamed Operation Detained I. The operation was a success, with the commandos returning to Vis with over 100 prisoners of war. The Partisans themselves launched a major raid on Korčula by landing six battalions, supported by mountain guns and mortars, during the night of 22 April. The raid proved to be highly successful, inflicting heavy casualties on German Forces and capturing a large amount of materiel.

The Germans reacted to these raids by adapting their island garrisons and tactics: quick response troops were station on the mainland, ready to be deployed on the islands in case of an attack, artillery coverage from coastal-based units was increased and fortifications were improved with large amounts of barbed wire and land mines. Following the success of the raid on Korčula carried out in April, the 26th Division Headquarters decided that the next such raid will be carried out against the German garrison on Šolta. Due to Šolta being part of the Split Channel and laying just 7–8 nautical miles (13–15 kilometres) from the Port of Split, the island represented a significant strongpoint in the German anti-amphibious defense of the central-Dalmatian coast, safeguarding free shipping through the Brač Channel.

== Prelude ==
The order to mount a raid on Šolta was issued on 4 May, with the amphibious landing planned during the night of 5/6 May and the assault itself during 6 May. The Partisan plan was to take a reinforced brigade, sail it in three convoys from Vis and land it on two locations on the south and southwest of Šolta. Following an undetected approach to German positions and preparations by means of artillery and airstrikes, the brigade would assault and overrun German positions and return to Vis during the evening. Allied Forces agreed to participate by providing landing craft for transporting the Partisans to Šolta and back, convoy protection and by performing airstrikes on German positions during the raid.

During the night of 27/28 April, the Partisan armed ship Jadran (NB-3) landed an intelligence officer of the 26th Division and a group of Allied troops on Šolta. They were picked up by Kornat (NB-8) during the night of 1/2 May, having collected only incomplete and partially correct information. It was believed that Mala Straža housed the bulk of the German Forces, prompting the Partisans to use an entire battalion in assaulting it, when in fact Mala Straža housed a small observation post manned by a handful of German soldiers. Intelligence gathered on German minefields surrounding their main defensive positions was also erroneous. One of the reasons for this was the almost non-existent local civilian population on which the Partisans usually relied when gathering intelligence. On 4/5 May Jadran (NB-3) landed an artillery officer and an officer of the 26th Division Headquarters to survey the terrain. During the same night, the motor launch B-1 landed a reinforced demolition platoon on Brač. The platoon consisted of 32 men of the 12th Brigade and was given the task of joining the Brač Partisan Detachment and mining the Nerežišća–Humac–Bobovišća road, thus depriving German Forces of the ability to move their mobile artillery closer to Šolta.

=== Order of Battle ===
Partisan ground forces selected for the raid consisted of the 1st Dalmatian Brigade, the 1st Battalion and a mortar company of 12th Dalmatian Brigade and an artillery battery of 76 mm (3.0 in) mountain guns. Naval assets taking part in the raid consisted vessels from both the Allies and the Partisan Navy (Serbo-Croatian: Ratna mornarica narodnooslobodilačke vojske Jugoslavije – RM NOVJ) . German Forces on Šolta consisted of the 3rd and 7th Companies of the 892nd Regiment, 264th Infantry Division, located on Mala Straža (Hill 197), Grohote, Hill 103 north of Grohote, Hill 103 and the port village of Rogač. German Forces also fielded artillery in Okrug Donji, Žedno and Slatine on the nearby island of Čiovo as well as a mobile coastal battery on Brač capable of moving into position to strike targets on Šolta. Because no encounters with Kriegsmarine vessels in the waters surrounding Šolta, Vis and Hvar occurred for some time leading to the raid, the Partisans deemed German naval activity as low. Instead, they believed that if any such naval thread did exist, it would come from the north from the direction of Šibenik.

Partisan forces bound for Šolta per Pribilović (1988, p. 235)
	Western convoy	Eastern convoy	Artillery convoy
Ships	2 × LCI; 1 × small galley	2 × LCI; 1 × small galley	4 × LCA; 1 × fishing vessel (the Sea Star); 1 × hospital ship; 1 × motor-sailboat (the Dupin); 1 × small galley
Embarked units	2 × battalions of the 1st Brigade; 1 × battalion of the 12th Brigade; mortar company of the 12th Brigade	2 × battalions of the 1st Brigade; mortar platoon of the 12th Brigade	mountain gun battery
Landing location	Šešula cove	Senjska cove	Šešula cove

== Raid ==
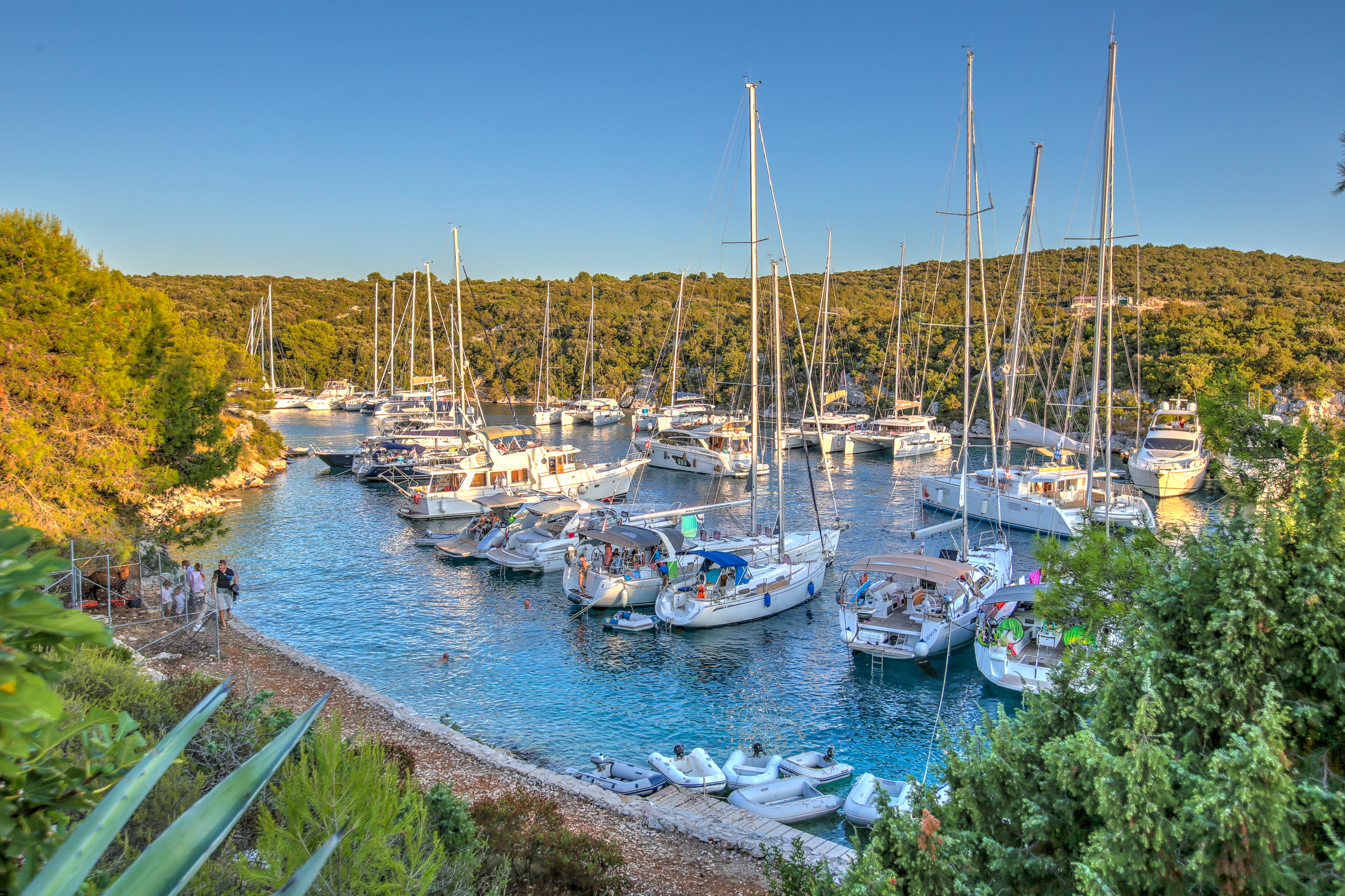
Šešula cove photographed in 2019.

The raiding party departed Vis at 21:00 hours on 9 May after a four-day delay due to strong winds. Three Royal Navy motor gunboats and two torpedo boats were dispatched from Komiža to patrol the area near Cape Ploča, south of Rogoznica, remaining there until 04:00 of 10 May before returning to Komiža. The eastern convoy landed in the Senjska cove at midnight, the western convoy landed in the Šešula cove at 01:00, followed by the artillery convoy along with BB Marin II arriving in Senjska at 02:15. The critical element of surprise was lost early on when a German observation post on Mala Straža observed the western convoy making its way into Šešula at 00:40. The German Command responded by deploying quick response troops from the mainland; a company of 150 troops was brought in from Kaštela to Split by truck, where they boarded the landing craft F-287 and assault boat I-01, departing at 04:10 headed for Rogač.

At 04:00 the 1st Battalion of the 1st Brigade engaged German Forces on Vela Straža, killing some and capturing others. At this point the Partisans realized that Mala Straža housed only a small observation post and a few troops. At 04:30 German artillery on Čiovo opened fire on Partisan positions. Despite losing the element of surprise, the Partisans decided to continue with the attack. At 05:20, German reinforcements arrived in Rogač, bringing the total number of German troops on Šolta to around 400. (Note: Novović (1985, p. 292) provides a number of 500–600 German troops on Šolta following the arrival of the reinforcements.) At 06:00 Partisan artillery began hitting German positions, followed by an Allied bombing run on Hill 103, Rogač and a strafing run on Mala Straža, lasting until 06:30. The bombing sunk the landing craft F-287 and damaged the assault boat I-01 which managed to escape to Čiovo. All German bunkers and fortified houses in Grohote remained intact while numerous minefields and continued artillery strikes from Čiovo hampered Partisan battalions maneuvering to get into position for an attack.

After the conclusion of the air and artillery attacks, Partisan Forces commenced their assault. Mala Straža was quickly overrun, after which the Partisans assaulted and encircled Grohote and Hill 103 defended by two German companies. Despite destroying the several bunkers, the fortified houses surrounded by barbed wire and aided by strikes from the Čiovo artillery, remained in German hands. Units attacking Hill 103 and Grohote were ordered to pull out, regroup and prepare for a new assault. Meanwhile, the German reinforcement company in Rogač attempted to secure Hill 101, but was pushed back and contained to Hill 22 above Rogač. The crew of the sunken landing craft attempted to reach Hill 22 but sustained four killed in action and 11 taken as prisoners while only five managed to reach it and link up with other German Forces. A second Partisan assault commenced at 14:30 following new strikes by artillery and Allied aviation. Rogač was captured, along with all but two bunkers on Hill 22, but the assault on the fortified houses in the north part of Grohote and Hill 103 failed again.

The order to make preparations to retreat from the island was given at 17:30. One final assault to cover the retreat was launched at 20:00 after which the Partisans began their movement back to Senjska and Šešula for a retreat to Vis. The hospital ship Marin II was the first ship to depart for Vis, followed by the sailboat Jadran carrying 40 wounded. The Partisans boarded Allied landing craft and departed Šolta at 01:00. The last of the Partisan ships departed Šolta at 02:15, reaching Vis around 05:00.

=== Sinking of Marin II ===
The Partisan hospital ship BB Marin II was a converted passenger motorboat originally capable of transporting up to 56 passengers, commanded by Ivo Šimetović and political commissar Vinko Karmelić. (Note: Marin II was a motorboat converted to a hospital ship during January 1944 on Vis, receiving the designation BB which stood for bolnički brod (lit. hospital ship). The stern space was modified with the addition of 22 stretchers to accommodate the wounded while the middle section featured an improvised surgical table. Red crosses were painted on both sides of the hull and the command bridge.) At around 02:15 on 10 May, Marin II reached Senjska where it proceeded to dock and camouflage. At 11:00 hours the ship sailed to Šešula where it gathered the wounded before returning to Senjska at 15:00. At 16:00 the order was given to embark the wounded on board. At 18:30 the ship attempted to depart for Vis but was attacked by machine gun fire from two German aircraft, forcing it to seek refugee along the coast and wait until the cover of night. Two crewmen suffered minor injuries in the attack while a number of injured soldiers jumped from the ship and started swimming to the shore. The ship finally departed Šolta at 21:30, carrying 49 wounded and travelling alone without an armed escort because of the wish to transport the casualties to Vis as soon as possible while at the same time being unable to keep up the speed of other transport ships ferrying troops from Šolta.

In response to the ongoing raid, at 20:15 of 10 May the Kriegsmarine dispatched the torpedo boats S-30, S-33 and S-61 from Boka Kotorska to the waters surrounding Vis. S-33 suffered engine problems while en route and returned to Boka Kotorska while the remaining two arrived in the Vis Channel shortly after midnight. During the same night the island and its port were bombed by German aircraft. Marin II reached the islet of Host at the mouth of the Port of Vis at around midnight, witnessing the German aircraft begging their bombing of Vis, dropping illumination round in the process. The crew decided against trying to enter the port until the air raid passed, instead setting sail to the open sea towards cape Stončica. Reaching a distance of 1.5 nautical miles (2.8 kilometres) from Stončica, the ship's machinery was shut down and the ship drifted on the surface.

The crew of Marin II noticed S-30 and S-61 closing in on their ship at high speed. Unaware of their true identity and expecting the approaching ships to be Allied, the ship's commander and political commissar responded with predetermined signals. The German torpedo boats moved closer, reduced their speed and responded by opening fire on the baffled Marin II. Although the ship was armed with three 8 mm (0.31 in) machine guns, the crew and the wounded Partisans did not return fire, instead continuing to shout at the torpedo boats in English, believing they were being fired upon by Allied ships by mistake. The ship's aft compartment caught fire leading to an explosion of an oil tank and engulfing the ship in flames. As the ship began to sink, the crew and the wounded jumped into the sea but were fired up from the torpedo boats. The ship finally sank at around 01:30 on 11 May.

From 00:40 to 01:00, the 4th Naval Coastal Sector (Serbo-Croatian: Četvrti pomorski obalni sektor – 4. POS) Headquarters received multiple reports from observation posts about sighting a clash at sea and that one of the ships involved was ablaze. Unaware on which ship was under attack, at 01:00 the Headquarters dispatched the patrol boat PČ-57 to investigate. After being notified about lighthouse keepers hearing cries for help east of Stončica, PČ-57 began searching the area and soon stumbled across the ship's commander, machine gunner and medic. After receiving news of the sinking of Marin II, the 4th POS Headquarters sounded the alarm and a more thorough search conducted by Jadran (NB-3), Kornat (NB-8), PČ-57 and three motor boats got underway at 05:00. Kornat (NB-8) found a wounded Partisan from the 1st Brigade holding on to wooden board and transferred him to one of the motor boats which took him back to Vis. The search continued until 08:30, finding only eleven bodies and pieces of wooden debris.

== Aftermath ==
Despite the Partisan Forces making repeated charges with the support of artillery and mortar strikes, the attacks failed because of the well-organized and prepared German defence. The Partisans were insufficiently equipped and trained on detecting and dismantling landmines, the Allied bombings had little effect in softening German defences, the Čiovo-based artillery continuously bombarded Partisan positions inflicting casualties and heavier anti-tanks weapons were needed to deal with German bunkers. Pribilović (1988, pp. 244–245) attributes the German successful defence of Šolta to the timely arrival of reinforcements, wrongful intelligence regarding German fortifications and the effectiveness of German artillery on Čiovo and a lack of coordination with Allied air assets. He further points out that the Partisan casualties started to mount once they reached German barbed wire obstacles and minefields for which they were ill-prepared to deal with.

On 14 May a commemoration for the victims of the sinking of Marin II was held on the Prirovo cemetery on Vis, after which the recovered remains were laid to rest in a shared grave. On 17 May, the RM NOVJ Headquarters issued a critical report on the sinking with the decision to sail away from Vis being among the first to be questioned. According to the report, the ship should have made an attempt at reaching one of the deserted coves on Vis instead of sailing to open sea and exposing itself to possible air and naval attack. However, according to Matković (1966, p. 250) the commander of Marin II indeed attempted that: with the port engulfed in flames from the bombing, he tried reaching the closest cove on Vis, only to be fired upon by Partisan shore batteries prompting him to sail about 2 nautical miles (3.7 kilometres) from the Stončica lighthouse. Another point made by the RM NOVJ Headquarters was directed at the crew's continued futile attempts at signaling the German boats believing they were being attacked by mistake, when instead they should have used the precious time to attempt a dash towards Vis in an effort to come under the protection of the shore batteries or at least beach the ship to try and prevent a total loss of the ship and its crew. Further criticism was directed at other Partisan vessels due to their lack of an appropriate response. Several ships located in the Stončica cove witnessed the clash, but made no effort in sailing out and investigating or providing assistance in its aftermath. Similarly, the commander of the sailboat Jadran which was sailing from Šolta to Vis observed the clash, only to proceed straight towards the port of Vis after it was finished instead of providing assistance. Pribilović (1988, p. 245) notes that the task of securing the area of operations was the responsibility of the Allies. Though one side of the area was covered by a patrol at Cape Ploča near Rogoznica, the other side of the area was left unsecured. He further considers that neither the Allies nor the RM NOVJ Headquarters had reliable intelligence regarding the presence of German torpedo boats in Boka Kotorska.

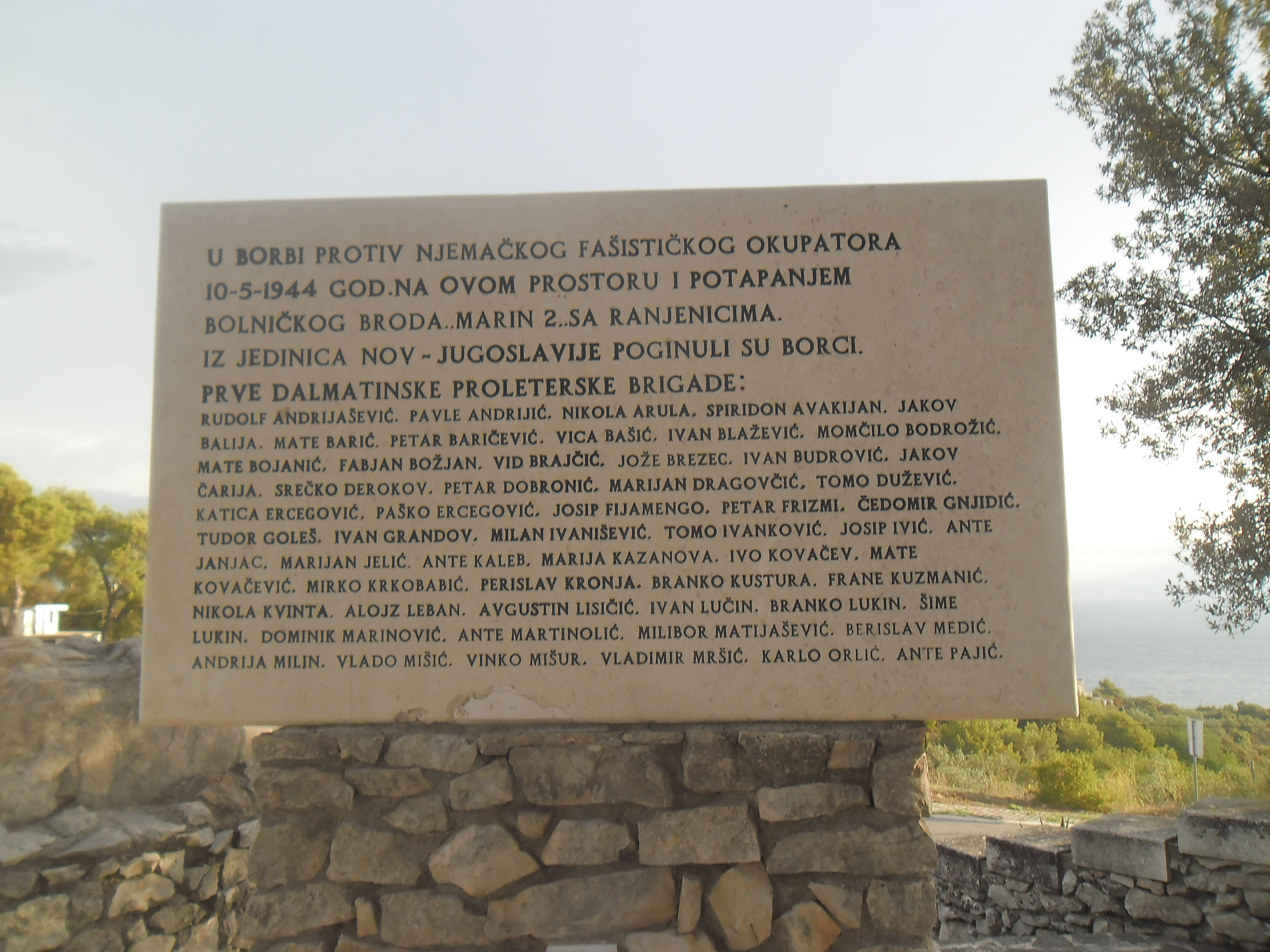
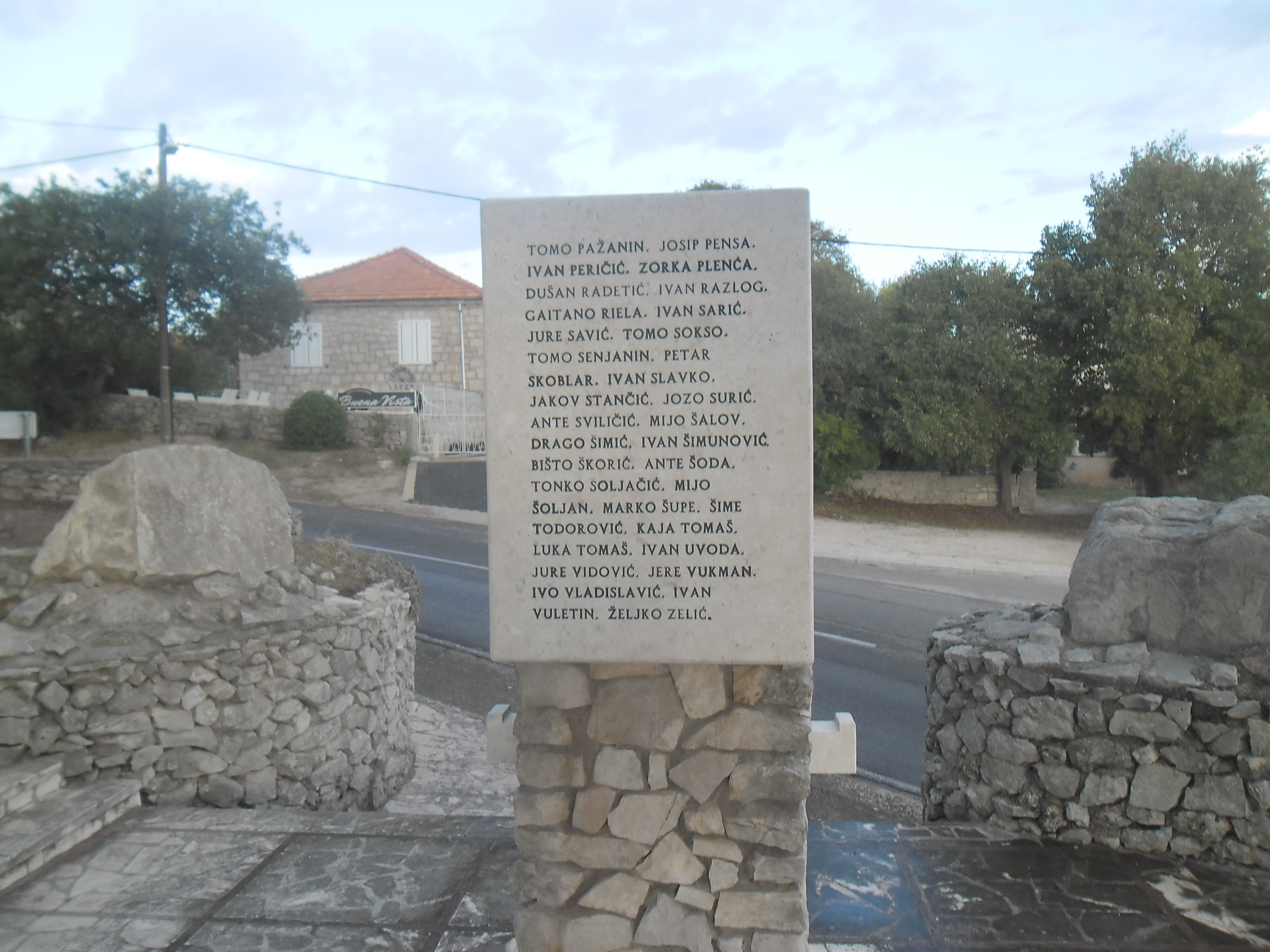
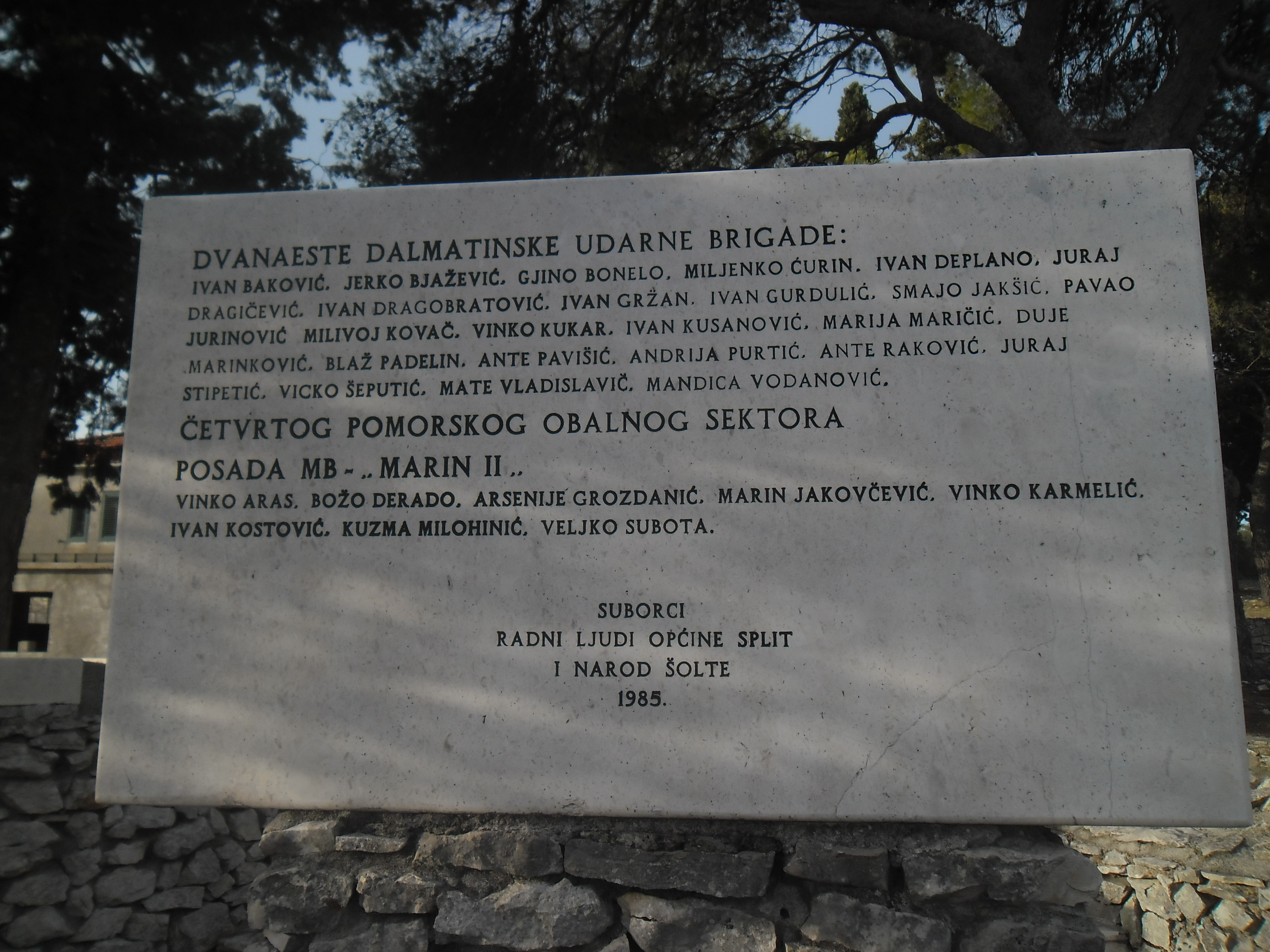
Memorials on Šolta dedicated to the Partisans of the 1st and 12th brigades and the crew of Marin II killed during the raid.

Although they failed to achieve the goal of completely overrunning German positions, the 8th Corps Headquarters nevertheless commended the soldiers and commanders of the 1st and 12th Brigade, with the 3rd Battalion of the 1st standing out. The Partisans suffered 40 killed and 129 wounded during the raid itself. An additional 57 wounded, crewmen and personnel died in the sinking of Marin II bringing it to a total of 97 killed and 82 wounded. (Note: Pribilović (1988, p. 244) provides a detailed list of Partisan military personnel killed in the sinking: six crewmen, including the ship's political commissar Vinko Karmelić and second-in-command Ivan Kostović, 4th POS Headquarters officer Arsenije Grozdanić, crewman Marin Jakovčević from the armed ship NB-11 Crvena Zvijezda on temporary assignment to Marin II, 41 wounded of the 1st Brigade, 6 wounded of the 12th Brigade and two medics.) Among those killed in the sinking were two wounded German prisoners and six civilians from Šolta. The commander of the 3rd Battalion of the 12th Ivan Dragobratović was killed in action, while the commander of the 3rd Battalion of the 1st Ilija Antunović was wounded. Exact figures on German casualties differ widely depending on the source. Kvesić (1979, p. 695) gives a figure of 150 killed and 52 taken as prisoners. Novović (1985, p. 296) mentions around 130 killed, wounded or taken prisoner. Pribilović (1988, p. 245) cites German sources as 34 killed, 82 wounded and 84 listed as missing.

The island itself remained under German control until 23 September 1944 by which time the Germans were being defeated on all fronts, including Yugoslavia where the National Liberation Army launched an all-out offensive, liberating large swaths of the country in the process. The liberation of the Dalmatian islands was carried out by the 8th Corps begging in early September with attacks on Hvar, Brač and Korčula. On 20 September Partisan scouts reported that German Forces were preparing to withdraw their forces from Šolta, prompting Partisan commanders to attack them. During the course of the next two days, the Partisans landed four Battalions of the 12th Brigade supported by an Allied Commando detachment numbering 450 men. After brief skirmishes, the planned full assault on German positions in Grohote never occurred as German Forces retreated to Rogač where they boarded ships waiting to transport them to Split. As they departed Rogač, the German ships were attacked by Royal Navy torpedo boats MTB 655 and MTB 633, sinking three of them with a loss of around 200 lives. Six soldiers survived after swimming back to Šolta where they were taken prisoner by the 12th Brigade.
