= Nogaro (disambiguation) =

Nogaro may refer to:

- Nogaro, a village and commune in the Gers département of south-western France
- Circuit Paul Armagnac, a motorsport race track near Nogaro, also called Nogaro Circuit
- Nogaro Airport (ICAO code: LFCN)
- Nogaro Bilbao, a former ice hockey team in Bilbao, Spain
- Žedno (Italian: Nogaro), a village on the island of Čiovo

== People ==
- Bertrand Nogaro (1880–1950), French economist and politician
- Raffaele Nogaro (1933–2026), Italian Roman Catholic bishop
