= Arbanija =

- Village
- Location within Split-Dalmatia County Location within Croatia
- Coordinates: 43.511896°N 16.304398°E
- Country: Croatia
- Region: Dalmatia
- County: Split-Dalmatia County
- City: Trogir

Area
  - Total: 1.6 km^{2} (0.62 sq mi)
- Elevation: 5 m (16 ft)

Population (2021)
  - Total: 349
  - Density: 220/km^{2} (560/sq mi)
- Time zone: UTC+1 (CET)
  - Summer (DST): UTC+2 (CEST)
- Postal code: 21224
- Area code: 021

Arbanija is a village on Čiovo Island, Croatia. The settlement is administered as a part of the City of Trogir and Split-Dalmatia County. According to the 2011 census, the village has 374 inhabitants. It is connected by the D126 state road.

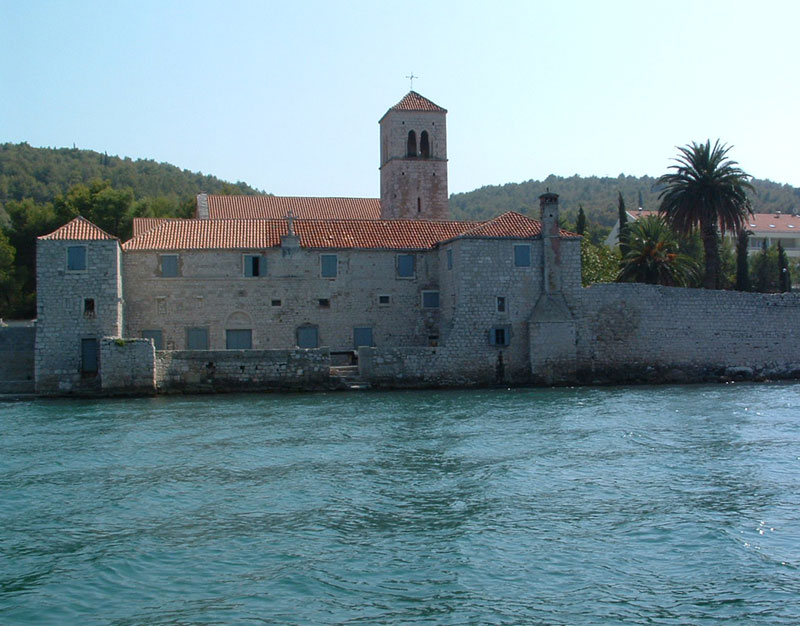
Sv. Križ monastery in Arbanija

The village is named after the Arbanasi, a group of ethnic Albanians that settled in several places on Croatia's Adriatic coast in the 18th century.
