= Okrug, Croatia =

Municipality in Split-Dalmatia County, Croatia

Okrug
- Interactive map of Okrug
- Location within Croatia
- Country: Croatia
- Region: Dalmatia
- County: Split-Dalmatia County

Area
  - Total: 9.8 km^{2} (3.8 sq mi)

Population (2021)
  - Total: 2,995
  - Density: 310/km^{2} (790/sq mi)
- Time zone: UTC+1 (CET)
  - Summer (DST): UTC+2 (CEST)
- Website: okrug.hr

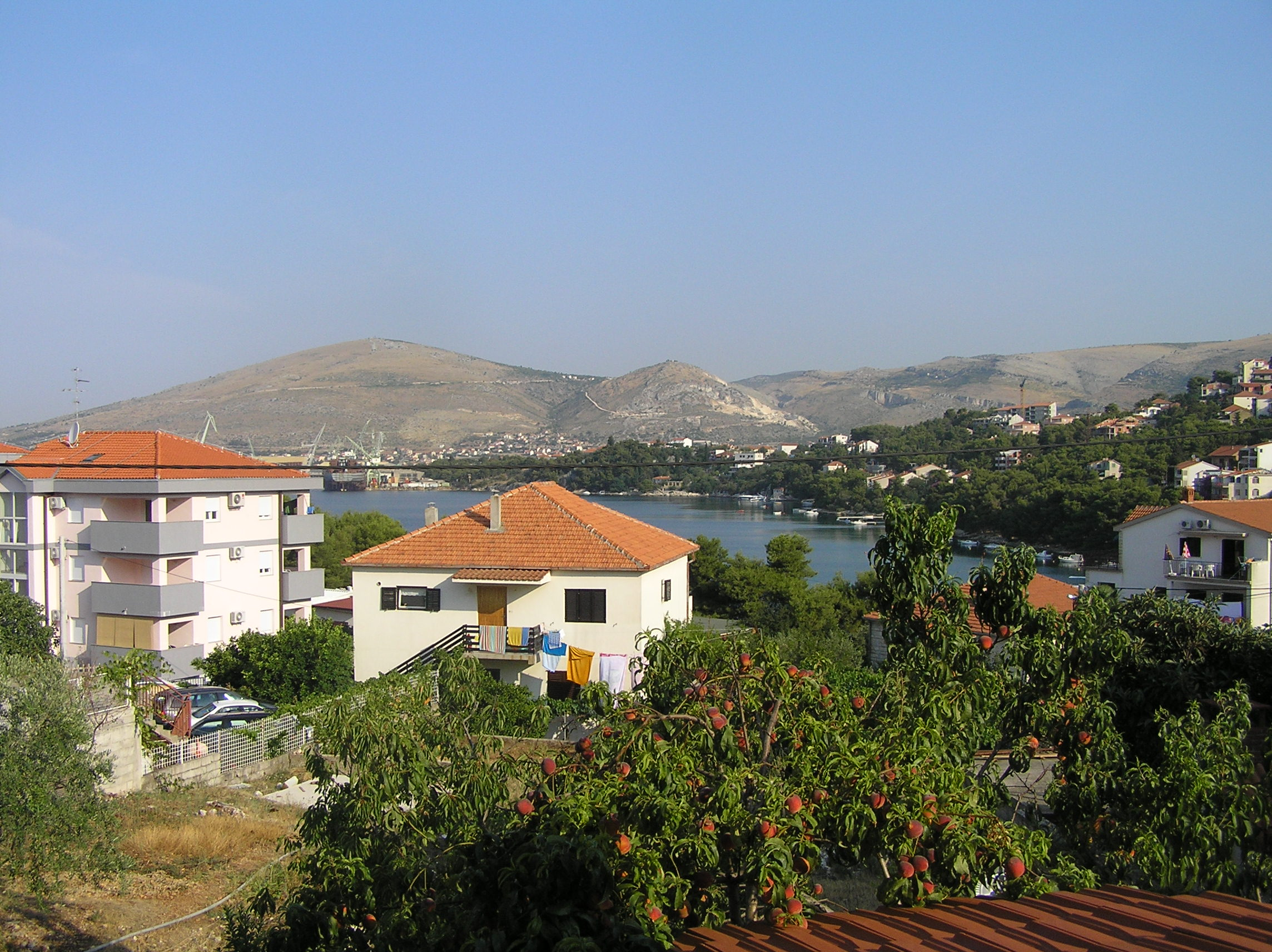

Okrug is a municipality in Croatia in the Split-Dalmatia County.

== Demographics ==
In the 2011 census, it had a total population of 3,349, in the following settlements:

- Okrug Donji, population 268
- Okrug Gornji, population 3,081

In the same census, 95% were Croats.

Okrug: Population trends 1857–2021
v

population	289	345	384	548	683	784	865	960	975	1030	1104	1015	1141	1640	2980	3349	2995
	1857	1869	1880	1890	1900	1910	1921	1931	1948	1953	1961	1971	1981	1991	2001	2011	2021

Sources: Croatian Bureau of Statistics publications

== Climate ==
The area has a typical Mediterranean climate characterized by hot, dry summers and mild, wet winters. The average annual temperature is around 16°C, with summer temperatures often exceeding 28°C, while winter temperatures drop to about 8–10°C. Most of the annual precipitation falls during the autumn and winter months, while the summer season is sunny with a large number of clear-sky days.
