= Trogir =

Town in Split-Dalmatia, Croatia

- Town
- Grad Trogir; Town of Trogir
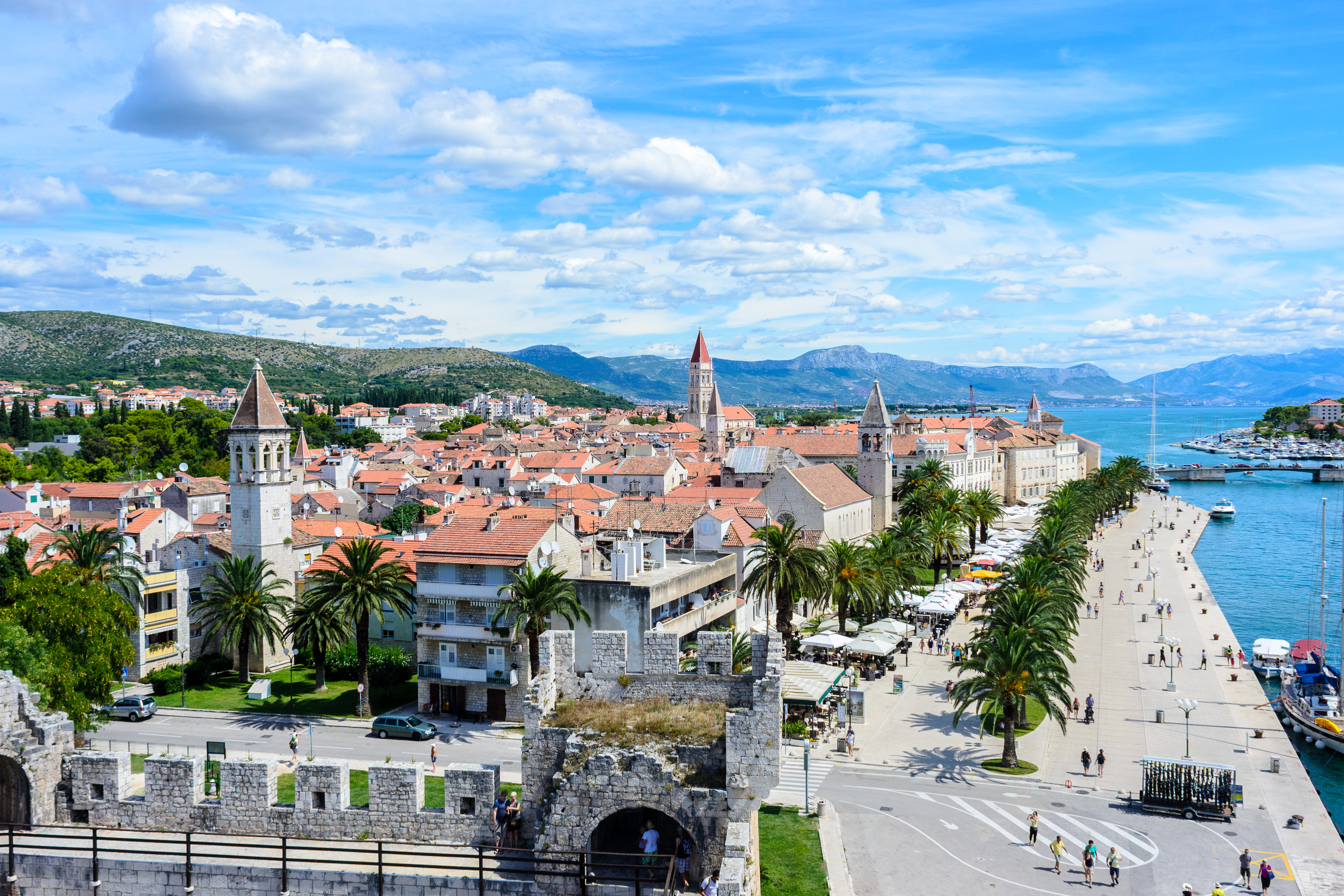
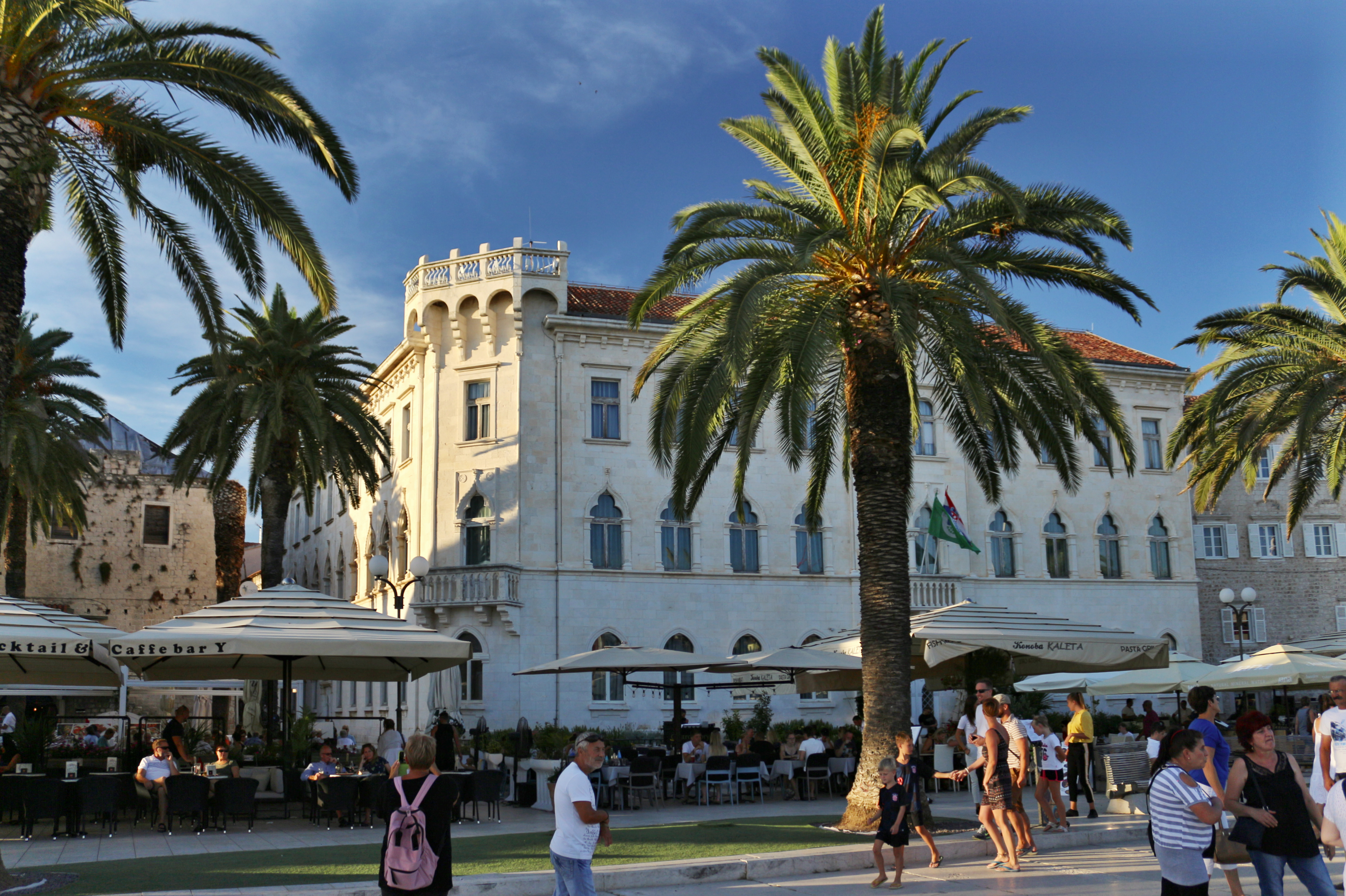
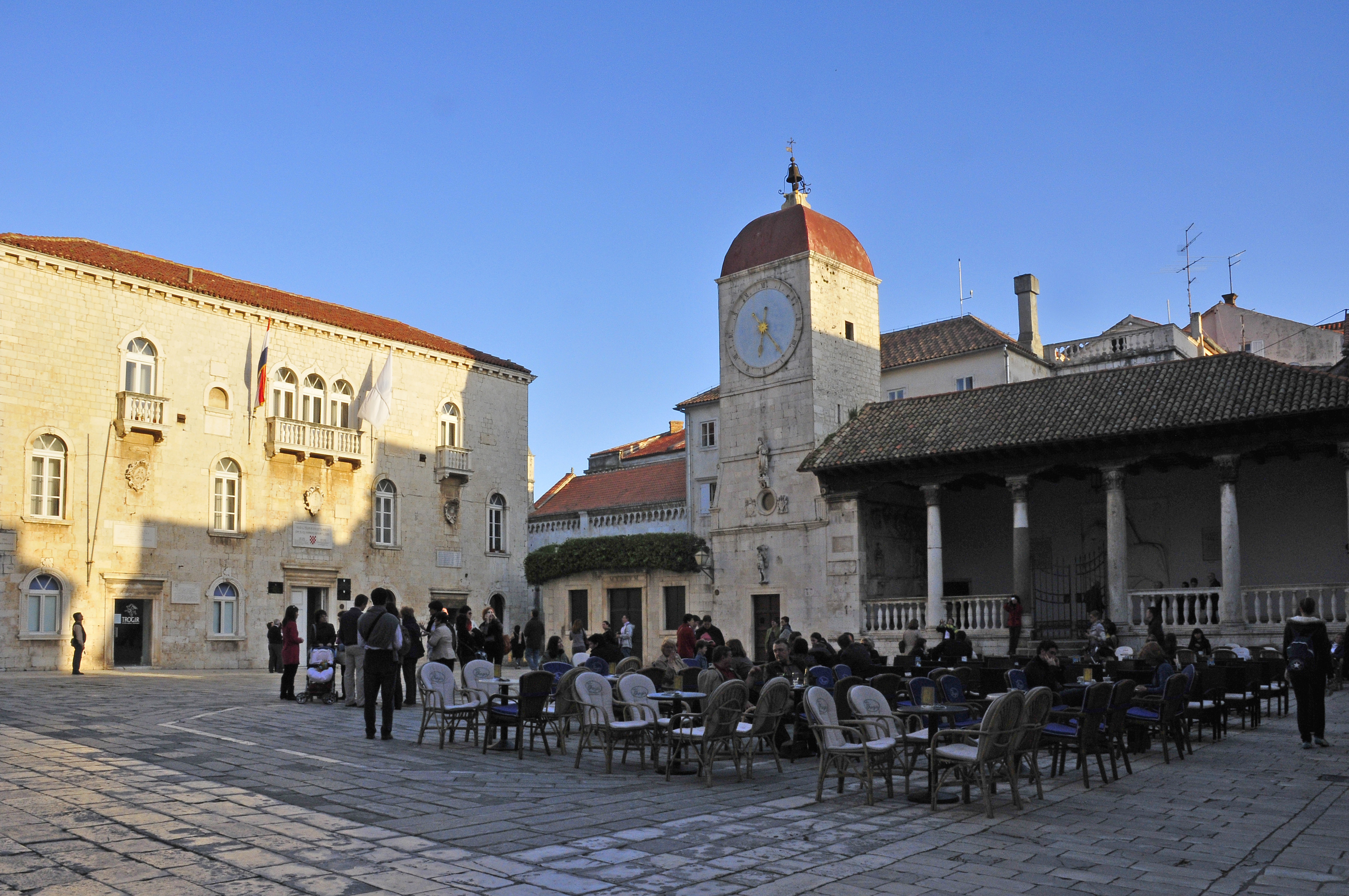
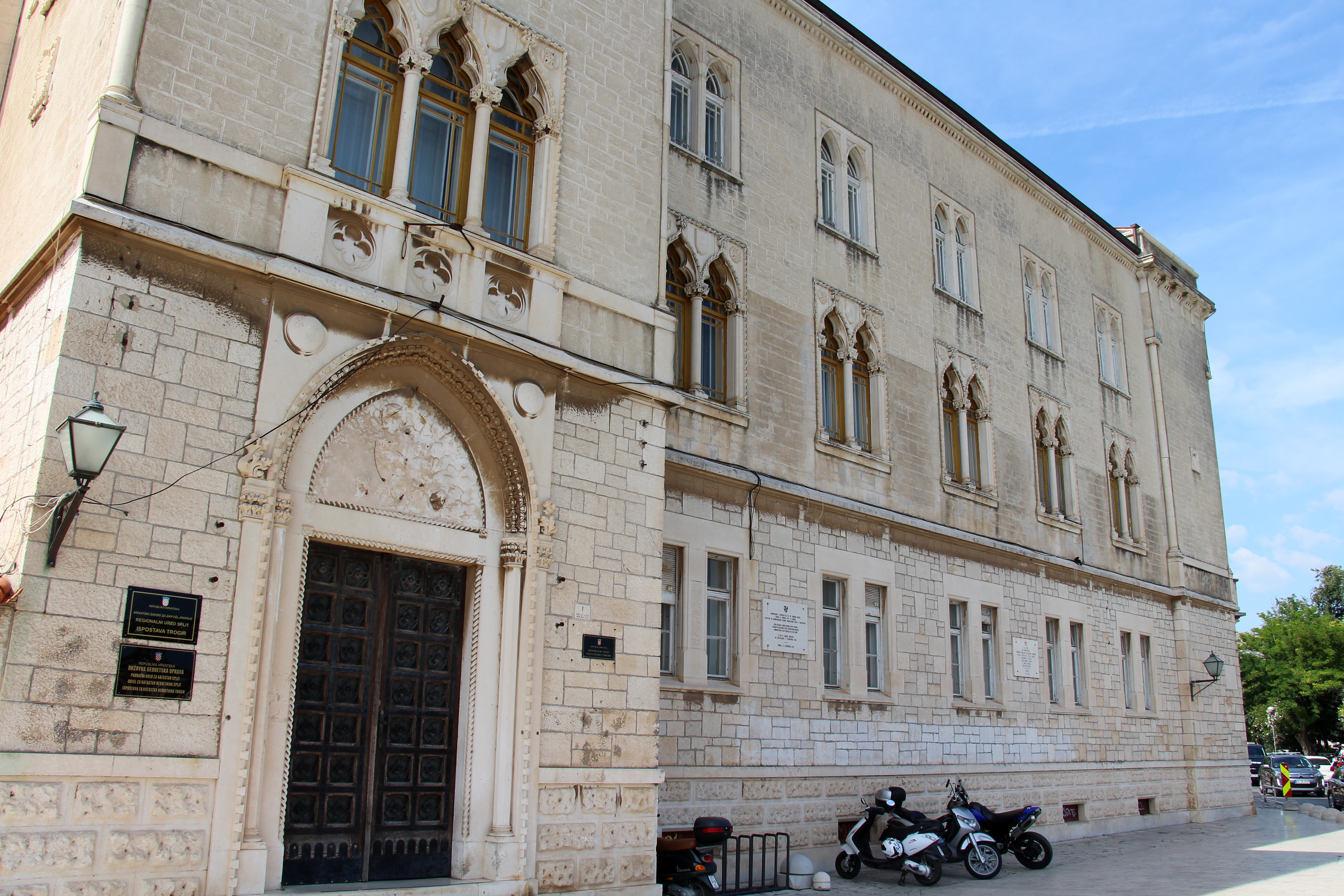
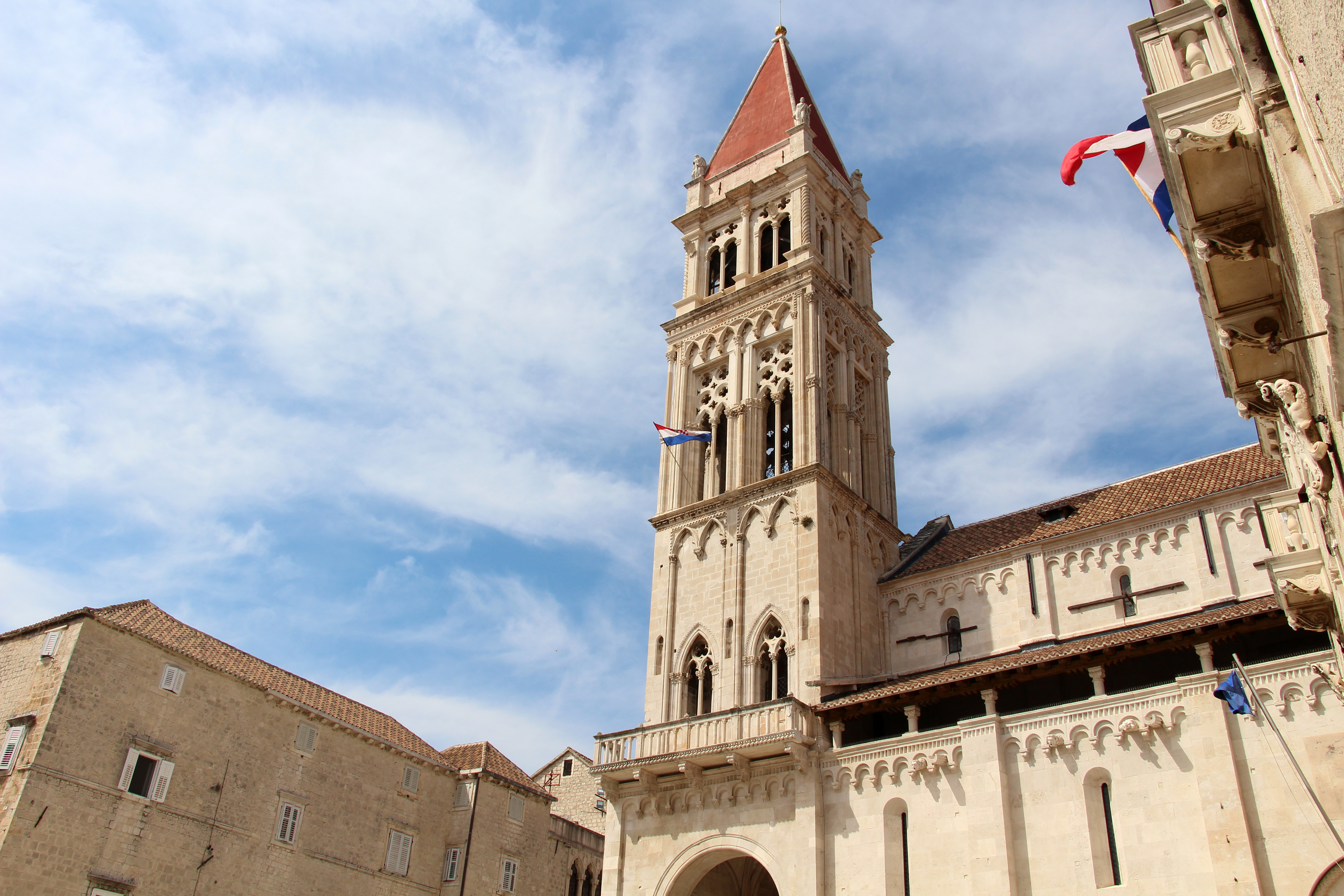
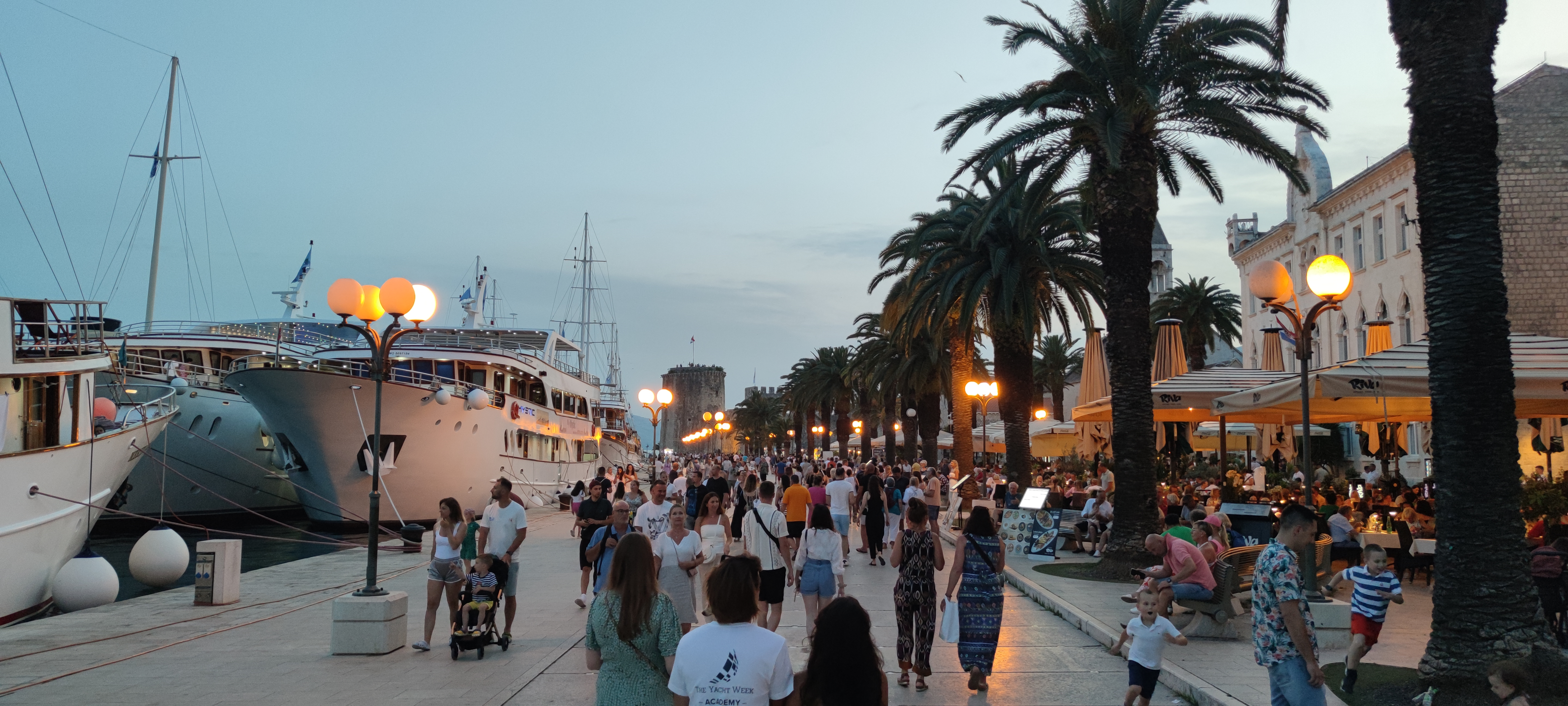
- Clockwise from top: Old town of Trogir – seen from Kamerlengo Castle, Old city town with Church of St. Sebastian with Clock Tower, Trogir Cathedral, Trogir's promenade, Courthouse Palace and Neo-Gothic Palace, turned school of Petar Berislavić

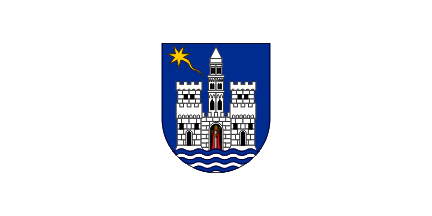
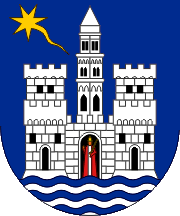
- Flag Coat of arms
- Interactive map of Trogir
- Location of Trogir in Croatia
- Coordinates: 43°31′0.85″N 16°15′4.91″E
- Country: Croatia
- Region: Dalmatia
- County: Split-Dalmatia County

Government
  - Mayor: Ante Bilić (SDP)

Area
  - Town: 39.3 km^{2} (15.2 sq mi)
  - Urban: 11.6 km^{2} (4.5 sq mi)

Population (2021)
  - Town: 12,393
  - Density: 315/km^{2} (817/sq mi)
  - Urban: 10,107
  - Urban density: 871/km^{2} (2,260/sq mi)
- Time zone: UTC+1 (CET)
  - Summer (DST): UTC+2 (CEST)
- Postal code: 21220
- Area code: 021
- Website: trogir.hr

UNESCO World Heritage Site
- Official name: Historic City of Trogir
- Criteria: Cultural: (ii)(iv)
- Reference: 810
- Inscription: 1997 (21st Session)
- Area: 6.4 ha (16 acres)

Trogir (Croatian pronunciation: [ˈtro.ɡiːr]) is a historic town and harbour on the Adriatic coast in Split-Dalmatia County, Croatia, with a population of 10,107 (2021) and a total municipal population of 12,393 (2021). The historic part of the city is situated on a small island between the Croatian mainland and the island of Čiovo. It lies 27 kilometres (17 miles) west of the city of Split.

Since 1997, the historic centre of Trogir has been included in the UNESCO list of World Heritage Sites for its Venetian architecture.

== History ==
In the 3rd century BC, Tragurion (Ancient Greek: Τραγύριον, Tragyrion or Τραγούριον, Tragourion) was founded as a colony by Ancient Greek colonists on the Illyrian coast from the island of Vis, and it developed into a major port until the Roman period. The name comes from the Greek "tragos" (male goat) and "oros" (hill or mountain). Similarly, the name of the neighbouring island of Bua comes from the ancient Greek "voua" (herd of cattle). The sudden prosperity of Salona deprived Trogir of its importance.

During the migration of Croats the citizens of the destroyed Salona escaped to Trogir. Initially the Roman Tragurium (Latin: Tragurium) was one of the Dalmatian City-States. From the 9th century on, Trogir paid tribute to Croatian rulers and to the Byzantine empire. The diocese of Trogir was established in the 11th century (abolished in 1828; it is now part of the Roman Catholic Archdiocese of Split-Makarska and has temporarily been a Latin titular bishopric). In 1107, it was chartered by the king of Hungary, Croatia and Dalmatia, Coloman, gaining thus its autonomy as a town.

In the year 1000, the Republic of Venice received submission from the Tragurium inhabitants and since then the city started to have commerce with the Italian peninsula, enjoying cultural and economic improvements. However, in 1105, it acknowledged the supremacy of Hungary, while retaining its municipal freedom, and received a charter in 1108.

In 1123, Trogir was conquered and almost completely demolished by the Saracens. However, it recovered in a short period of time to experience powerful economic prosperity in the 12th and the 13th centuries, with some autonomy under Venetian leadership. In 1242, King Béla IV of Hungary found refuge there as he fled the Mongols, who were unable to storm the island city. In the 13th and the 14th centuries, members of the Šubić family were most frequently elected dukes by the citizens of Trogir; Mladen III (1348), according to the inscription on the sepulchral slab in the Cathedral of Trogir called "the shield of the Croats", was one of the most prominent Šubićs. In Dalmatian, the city was known as Tragur.

After the War of Chioggia between Genoa and Venice, on 14 March 1381 Chioggia concluded an alliance with Zadar and Trogir against Venice, and finally Chioggia became better protected by Venice in 1412, because the newly (21 July 1412) conquered Šibenik, called Sebenico by the Venetian Republic, became the seat of the main customs office and the seat of the salt consumers office with a monopoly on the salt trade in Chioggia and on the whole Adriatic Sea.

In 1420, the period of a long-term Venetian rule began and lasted nearly four centuries, when Traù (from Dalmatian, Venetian and Italian: pronounced [traˈu]) was a city with rich economy, as exemplified by numerous Renaissance works of art and architecture. In about 1650 a manuscript of the ancient Roman author Petronius' Satyricon was discovered at Trogir which contained the Cena Trimalchionis ("Trimalchio's Dinner"). This is the longest surviving portion of the Satyricon and a major discovery for Roman literature.

On the fall of Venice in 1797, Traù became a part of the Habsburg Empire, which ruled over the city until 1918, with the exception of Napoleon Bonaparte's French rule from 1806 to 1814 (when the city was part of the Napoleonic Kingdom of Italy and Illyrian Provinces).

After World War I, Trogir, together with most parts of Dalmatia, became a part of the State of Slovenes, Croats and Serbs and subsequently the Kingdom of Yugoslavia. During this period Dalmatian Italians, who until 1918 were present in the city, left for Italy. In 1939, it become a part of Banovina of Croatia. During World War II, Trogir was annexed by Italy and was part of the Italian Governorate of Dalmatia from 1941 to 1943 being part of the province of Spalato. After a short period of partisan rule it became part of the Independent State of Croatia under German military supervision from 1943 to 1944. Subsequently Tito's Partisans's 26 Division liberated it for the second time on 27.10.1944. After that it belonged to the second Yugoslavia, and from 1991 to Croatia.

== Population ==
In 2021, the town had 12,393 residents in the following 8 settlements:

- Arbanija, population 349
- Divulje, population 52
- Drvenik Mali, population 119
- Drvenik Veliki, population 170
- Mastrinka, population 837
- Plano, population 607
- Trogir, population 10,107
- Žedno, population 152
Town of Trogir: Population trends 1857–2021
v

population	3981	4636	4066	4531	4705	5049	4740	6271	6344	6825	7074	7508	9699	11484	12995	13192	12393
	1857	1869	1880	1890	1900	1910	1921	1931	1948	1953	1961	1971	1981	1991	2001	2011	2021

Sources: Croatian Bureau of Statistics publications

== Geography ==
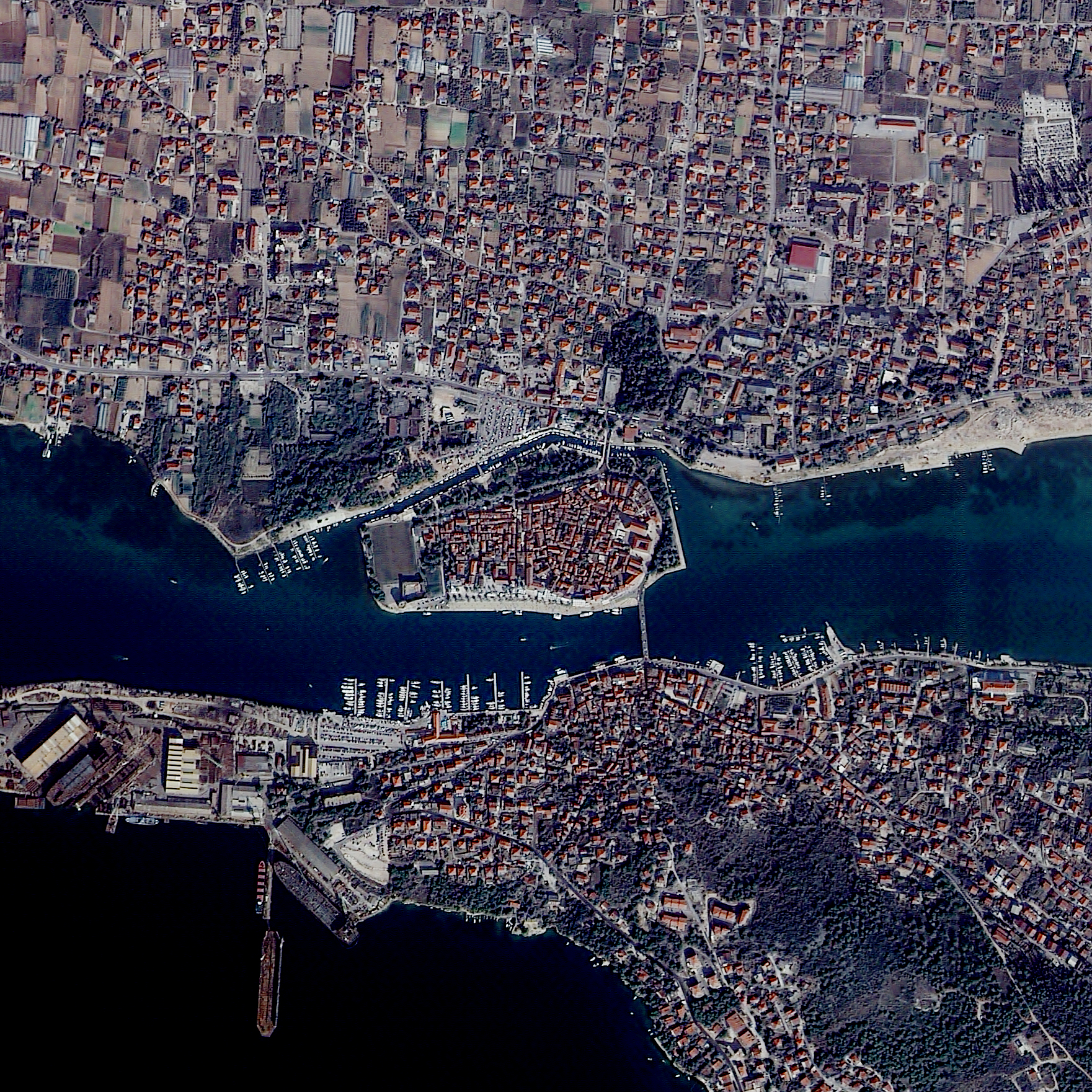
Satellite view of Trogir and its old town

City of Trogir is located in Dalmatia region, in Kaštela bay, at the entrance of Čiovo strait. Old town Trogir is located on little islet in the middle of Čiovo strait and it is connected with the bridges from both sides.

Trogir is often considered to be a part of Split larger metropolitan area, which connects Trogir, Kaštela, Solin and Split itself. The city is six kilometres (3.7 miles) from Split Saint Jerome Airport, and a regular bus connects Trogir with the airport and Split. In the future, the Split Suburban Railway will be lengthened towards the airport and Trogir.

There are two yacht marinas in Trogir.

Water supply to Trogir is sourced from the Jadro River, the source that once supplied the ancient Diocletian's Palace.

Trogir has Mediterranean climate, with hot summers, often reaching 31 °C (87 °F), and winters reaching from 4 °C to 12 °C (39.2 °F to 53.6 °F).

== Main sights ==
Historic City of Trogir
UNESCO World Heritage Site
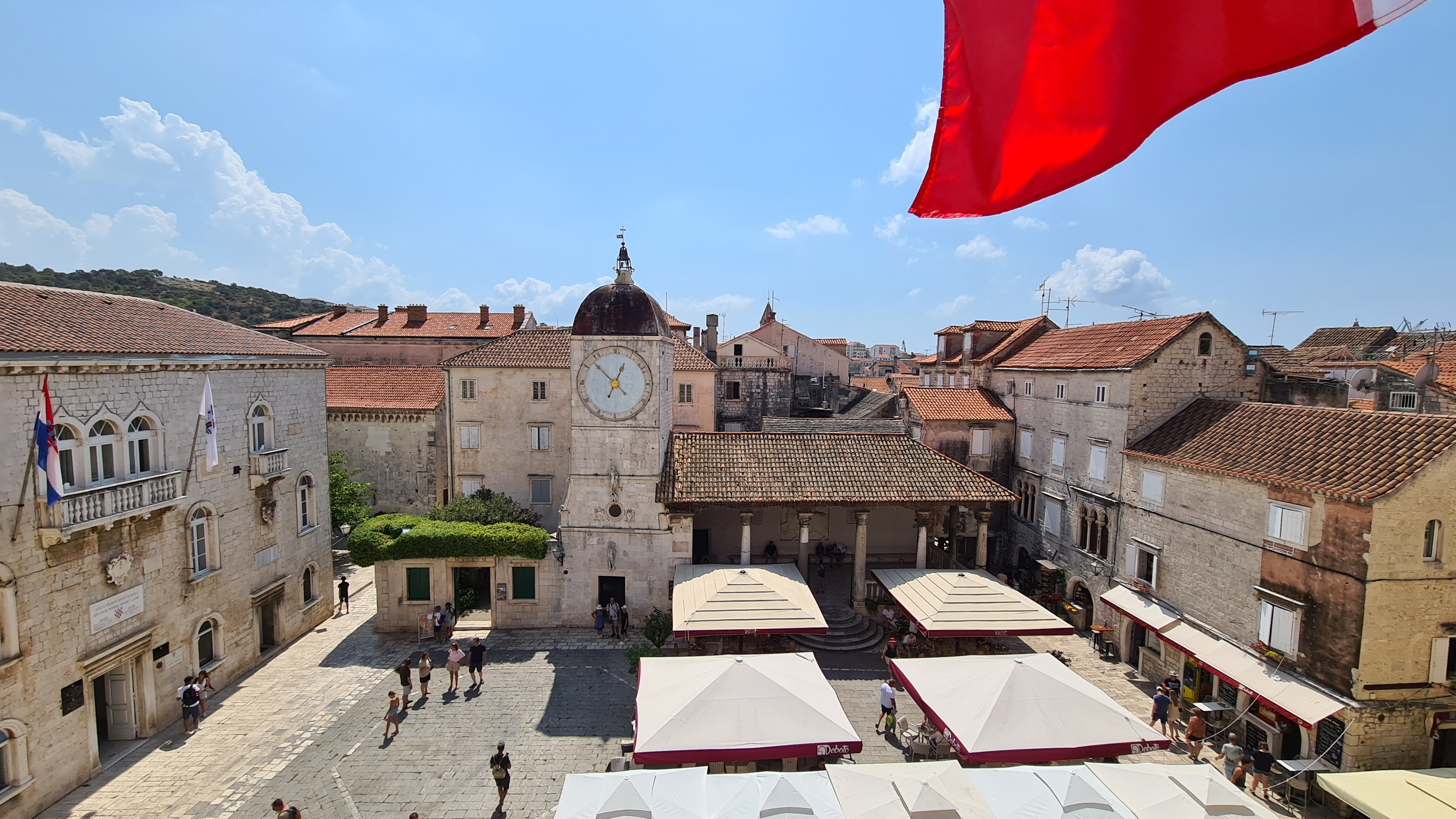
- Interactive map of Historic City of Trogir
- Criteria: Cultural: ii, iv
- Reference: 810
- Inscription: 1997 (21st Session)
- Area: 6.4 ha (16 acres)

Trogir has 2300 years of continuous urban tradition. The area was inhabited by ancient Greeks, Romans, and Venetians. Trogir has a high concentration of palaces, churches, and towers, as well as a fortress on a small island. In 1997, was inscribed in the UNESCO World Heritage List. "The orthogonal street plan of this island settlement dates back to the Hellenistic period and it was embellished by successive rulers with many fine public and domestic buildings and fortifications. Its beautiful Romanesque churches are complemented by the outstanding Renaissance and Baroque buildings from the Venetian period", says the UNESCO report.

Trogir is the best-preserved Romanesque-Gothic complex not only in the Adriatic, but in all of Central Europe. Trogir's medieval core, surrounded by walls, comprises a preserved castle and tower and a series of dwellings and palaces from the Romanesque, Gothic, Renaissance and Baroque periods. Trogir's grandest building is the Trogir Cathedral (church of St. Lawrence), whose main west portal is a masterpiece by Radovan, and the most significant work of the Romanesque-Gothic style in Croatia.

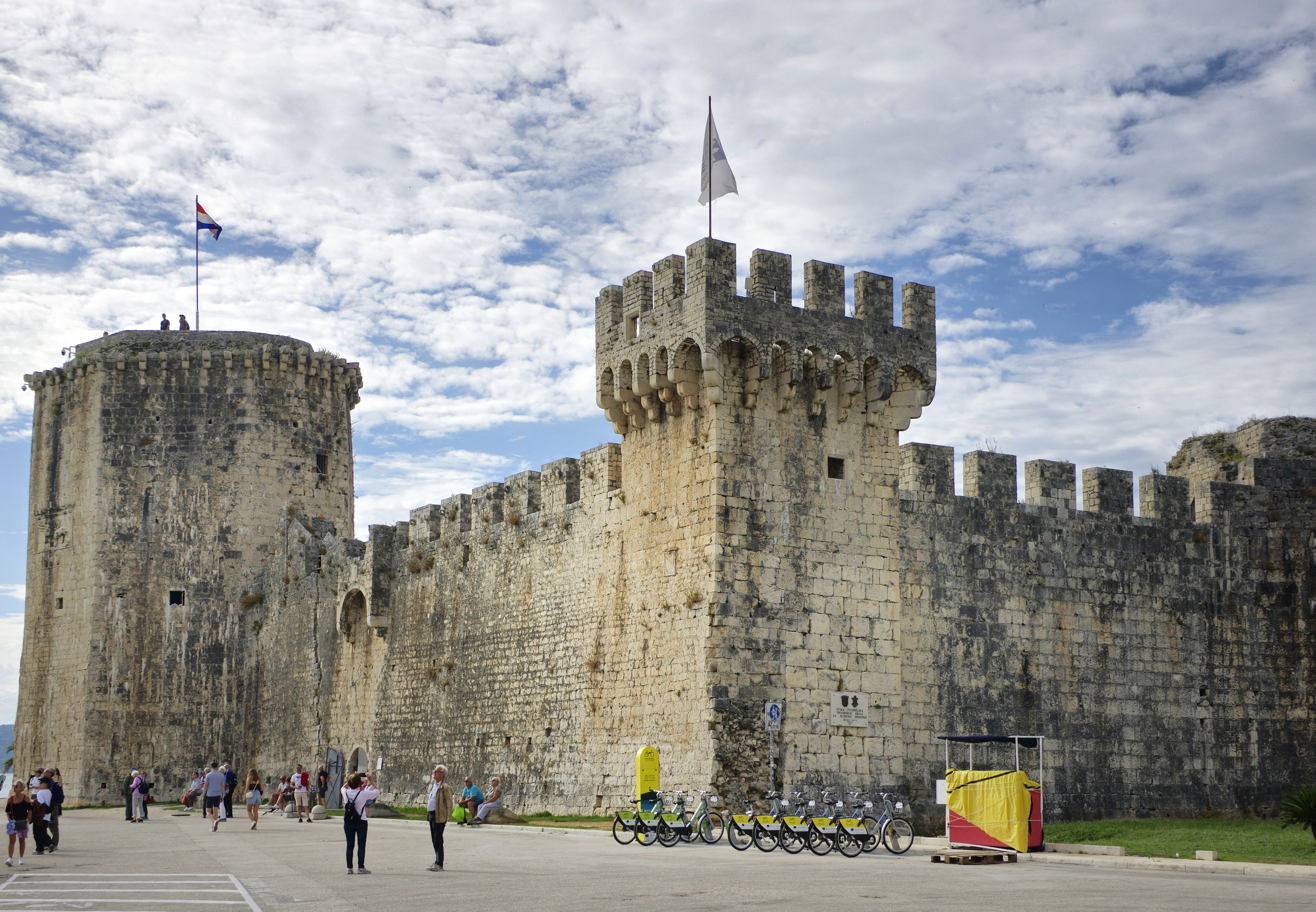
Kamerlengo Castle

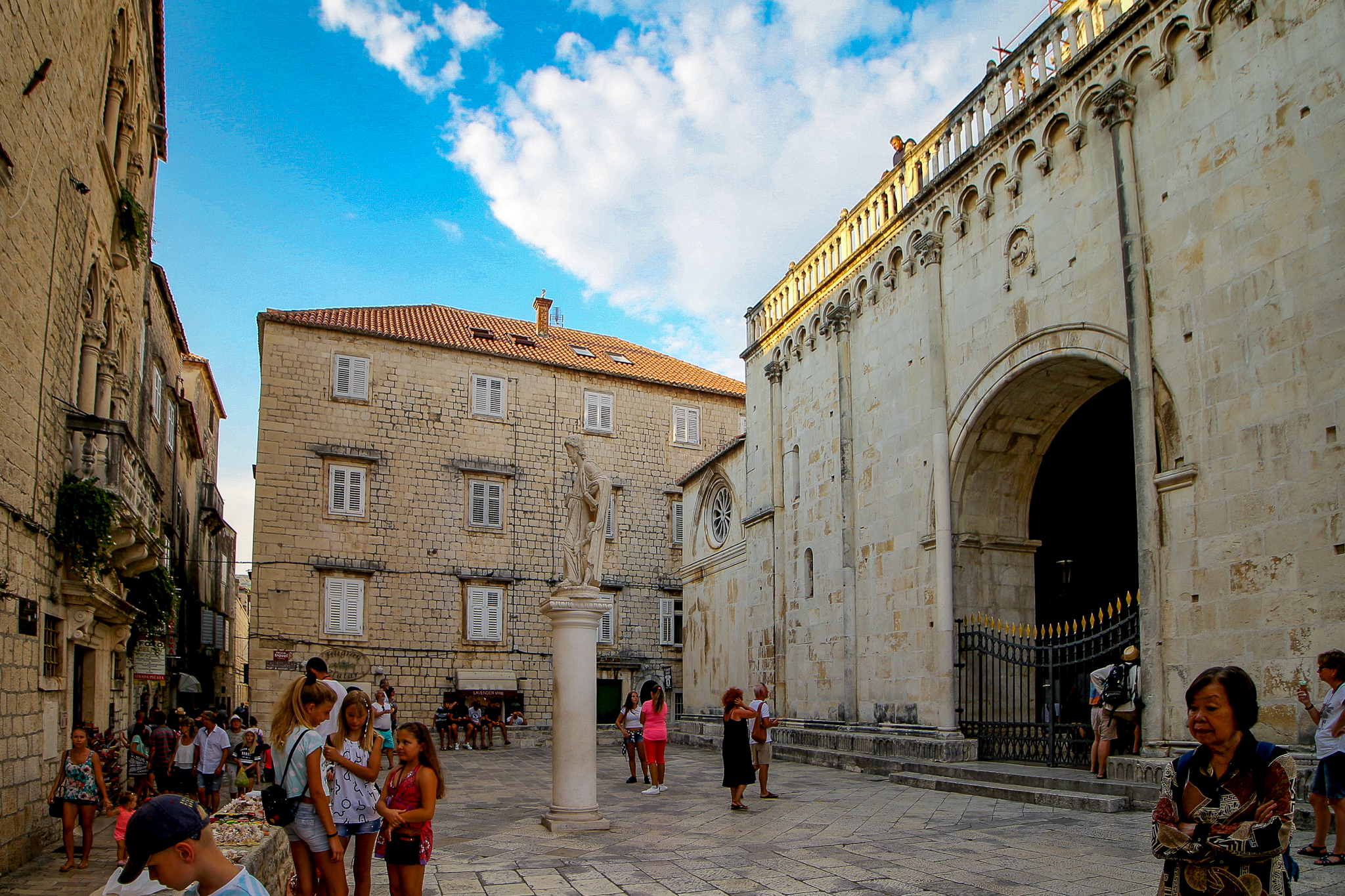
Trogir Cathedral entrance and square

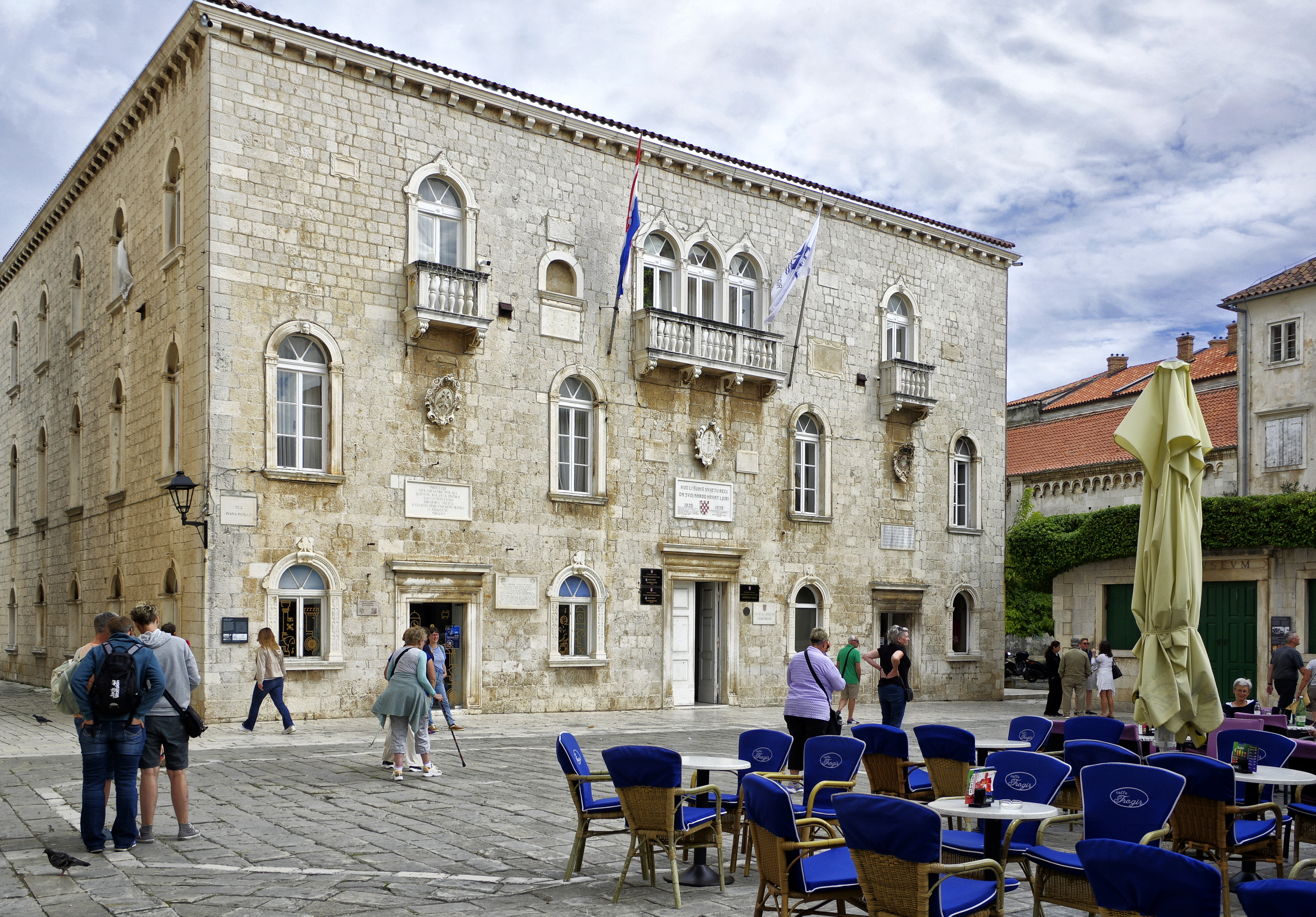
Trogir City Hall

The most important sites include:

- Historical city core, with about 10 churches and numerous buildings from the 13th century
- The city gate (17th century) and city walls (15th century)
- The Fortress Kamerlengo (15th century)
- The Duke's Palace (13th century)
- The Cathedral (13th century) with the Portal of Master Radovan, the unique work of this Dalmatian artist
- The big and small palaces Cipiko from the 15th century
- The city loggia from the 15th century

The St. Peter Church was part of the women's Benedictine monastery which was, according to the legend, founded by the wife of king Bela IV of Hungary. The west front of the church is embellished by a Baroque portal decorated with a bust of St. Peter, the work of Niccolo di Giovanni Fiorentino. The interior was restored in a Baroque style in the second half of the 17th century. The wooden ceiling dating from that period is divided into oval, semioval and hexagon fields, framed by richly decorated borders. It was then that the two side-altars were added, dedicated to Mother Mary and St. Ignatius of Loyola. The high altar from the same period was made of wood, but only the statues of St. Peter and St. Paul have survived to the present day. Set into the pavement of the church one finds tombs of Trogir noble families Andreis and Cipiko.

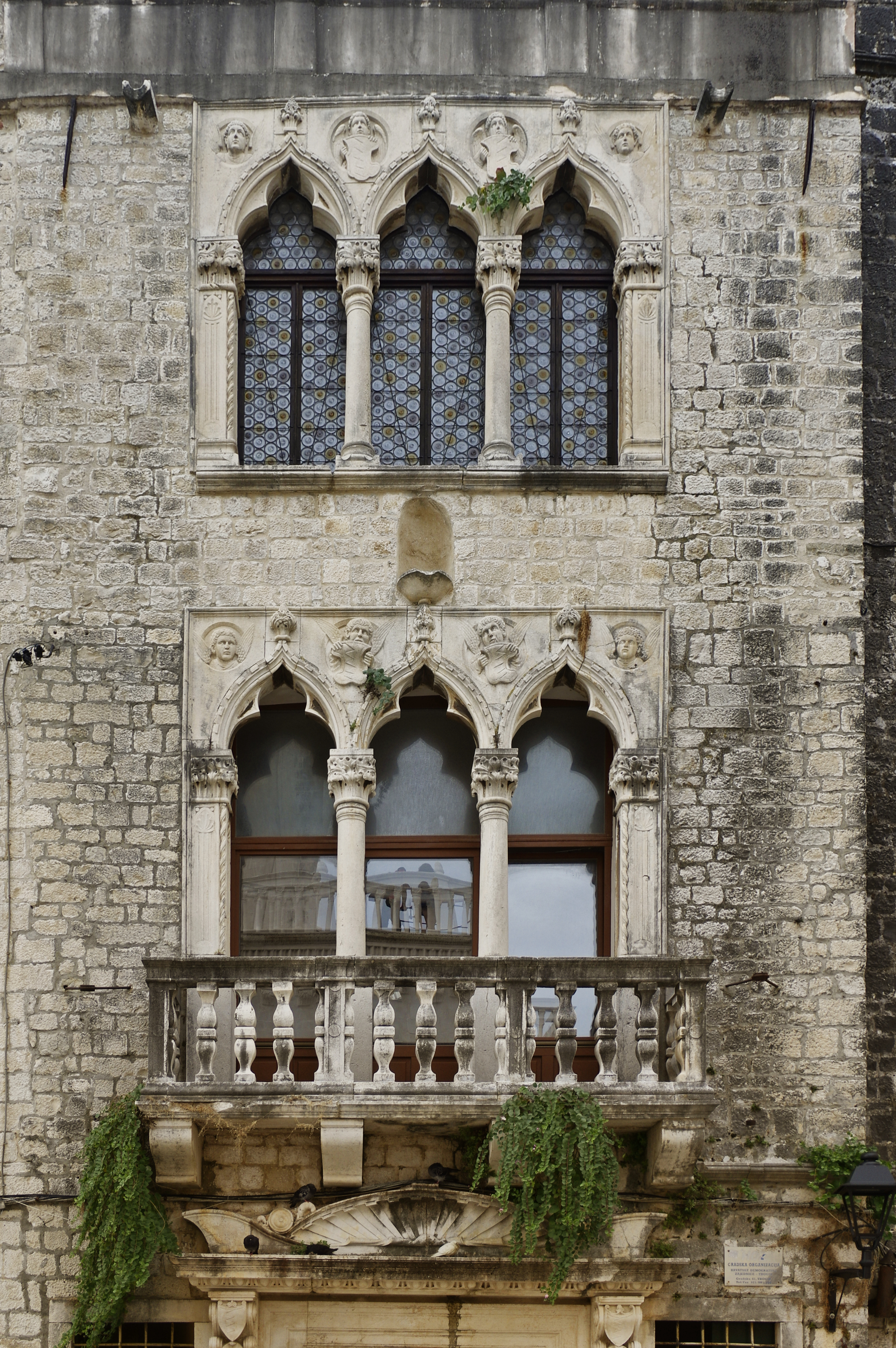
Cippico (Čipiko) Palace

The St. Sebastian's Church was built in 1476 as a votive church or an offering given by the citizens of Trogir in thanks for deliverance from the plague. The front of this Renaissance building, which was executed by Niccolo di Giovanni Fiorentino, is decorated with the sculptures of St. Sebastian and Christ the Saviour. It displays the coats of arms of Bishop Giacomo Torlon and that of the duke Malipiero. Above the front rises the two-story tower of the town clock. A part of the eastern wall contains the remains of a centrally planned church with six apses dedicated to St. Mary. Against the west walls rests a plaque bearing names of the fallen defenders in the Croatian War for Independence.

The Town Loggia of Trogir was first recorded in documents of the 13th century. It served as a furnished public gathering space, and on certain dates and hours it was used by the communal legal service, as a place were contracts were signed, official announcements made, laws proclaimed, and where law proceedings took place. In 1471, the workshop of Niccolo di Giovanni Fiorentino executed a relief of Justice on the eastern wall, depicting the Venetian lion with S. Lawrence and B. John of Trogir, both guardians of the city. It was, in fact, a monument dedicated to the Republic of Venice. The central field with the lion was removed in 1932. On the south wall, the relief of a horseman depicting Petar Berislavić, viceroy of Croatia (1513–1520), was done by Ivan Meštrović. The Loggia was renovated in 1892.

The Garagnin-Fanfogna Palace is constituted of two blocks of Romanesque and Gothic buildings, incorporated into the ensemble in the second half of the 18th century, after the plans of Ignacije Macanović. The two-story building with the stone stairway situated on the south side originally had an economy purpose. Today its ground floor houses the town lapidarium within which the city walls of the Hellenistic Tragurion are presented. On the first floor there is Cata Dujšin-Ribar Gallery. The main entrance to the Palace with a lobby and a staircase was situated on the east side, in the main street, and decorated with a Late Baroque elements characteristic of the Macanović workshop. In the interior there is the original 18th century drawing room embellished with stucco decorations. The library owned by Ivan L. Garagnin (1722–1783), a numismatist and collector of archaeological monuments, is decorated with wall paintings portraying philosophers and writers. The ensemble houses collections of paintings and graphics from the 17th and 18th centuries and the Town Museum.

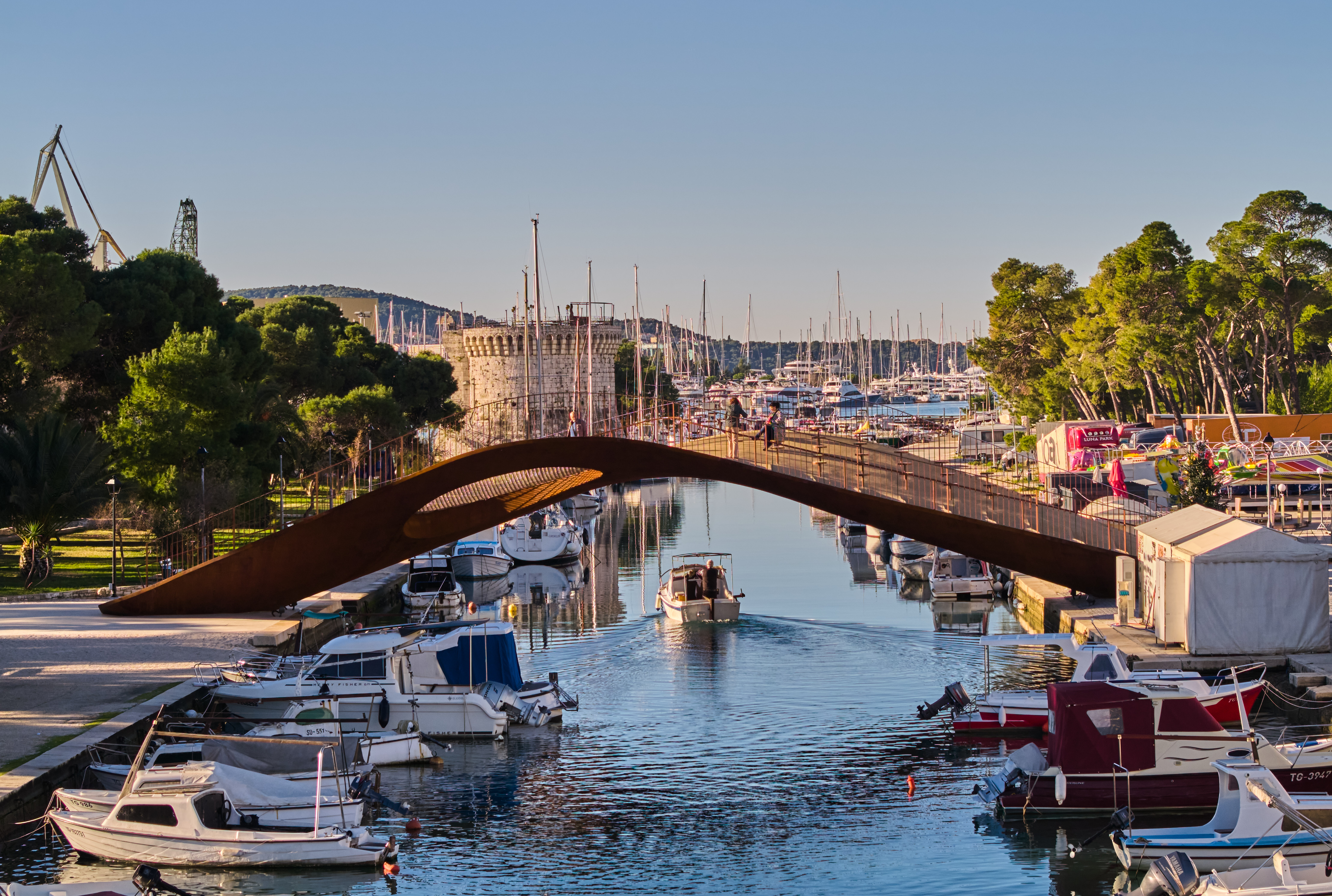
Footbridge over Foša Channel

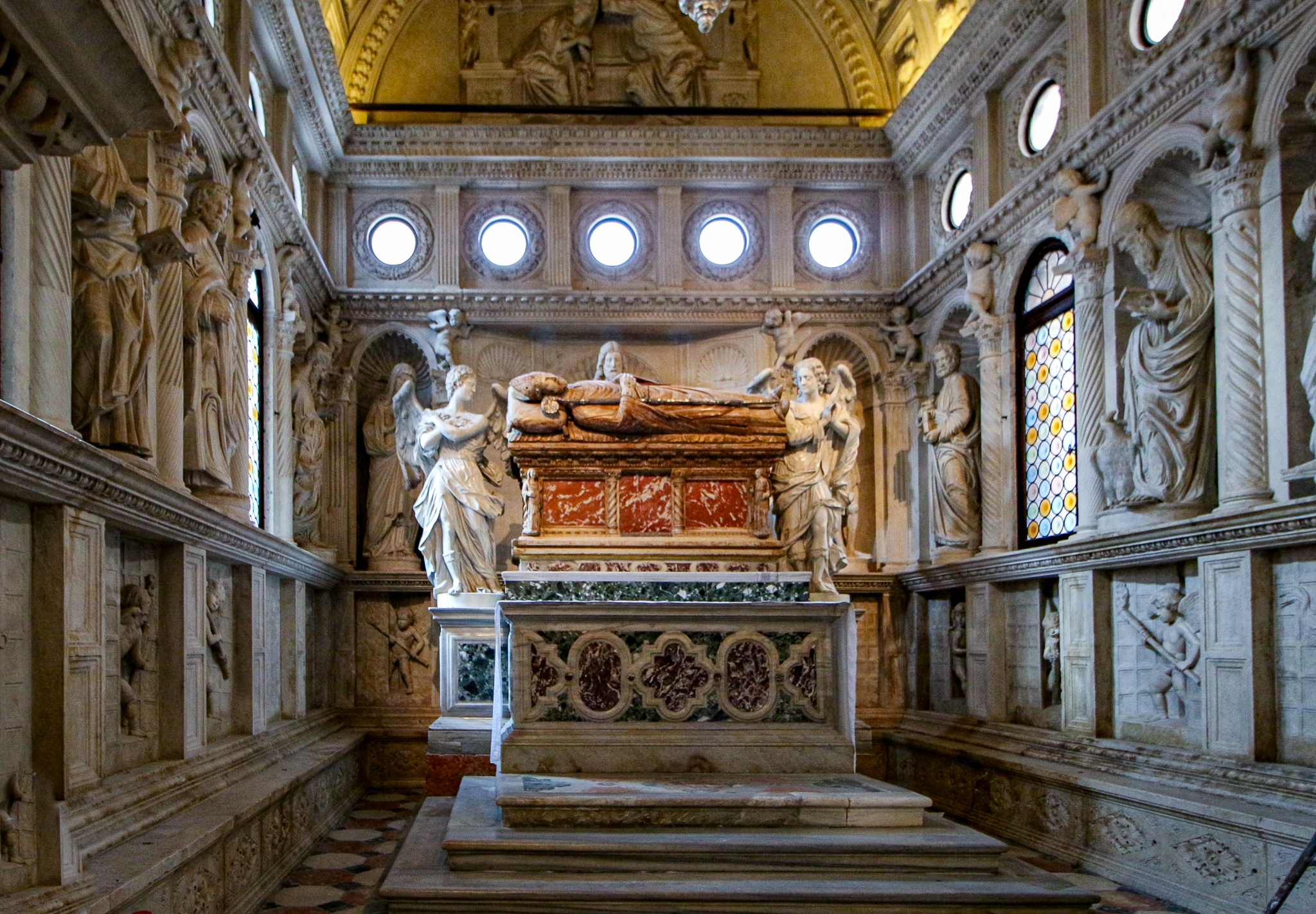
Trogir Cathedral interior

The Museum of sacred art is hosted in the Late Baroque building on the Trogir main square, dating from the 18th century. There is a rich collection of early Dalmatian and Venetian sacred paintings (14th–15th century) with masterpieces of Gentile Bellini, Paolo Veneziano, Quirizio da Murano and others. Works of local masters, paintings of Blaž Jurjev Trogiranin [Blase, son of George from Trogir] or the 13th century polyptych of the cathedral's high altar are exhibited in the Pinacotheca.

The Santa Maria de Platea belongs to the early 9th century hexafoil pattern churches. It is the central type building, consisting of a high dome surrounded by six apses, in the manner of Carolingian chapels. In the 17th century visitation four altars were described: the high was dedicated to the Assumption of Mary; the Renaissance one, built in 1463, was dedicated to St. Jerome; the remaining two were dedicated to St. Mary of Loreto and St. Lucy respectively. The church was demolished in the mid 19th century, its only image is preserved on the 18th century French illustrator Ch. L. Clerisseau's drawing. The apses had three niches divided by pilaster strips on the outside surface wheres niches and windows gave rhythm to the tambour of the dome. To the west there was a portico used as a medieval courtroom, street was closed by the city clock tower in the 15th century.

== Economy ==
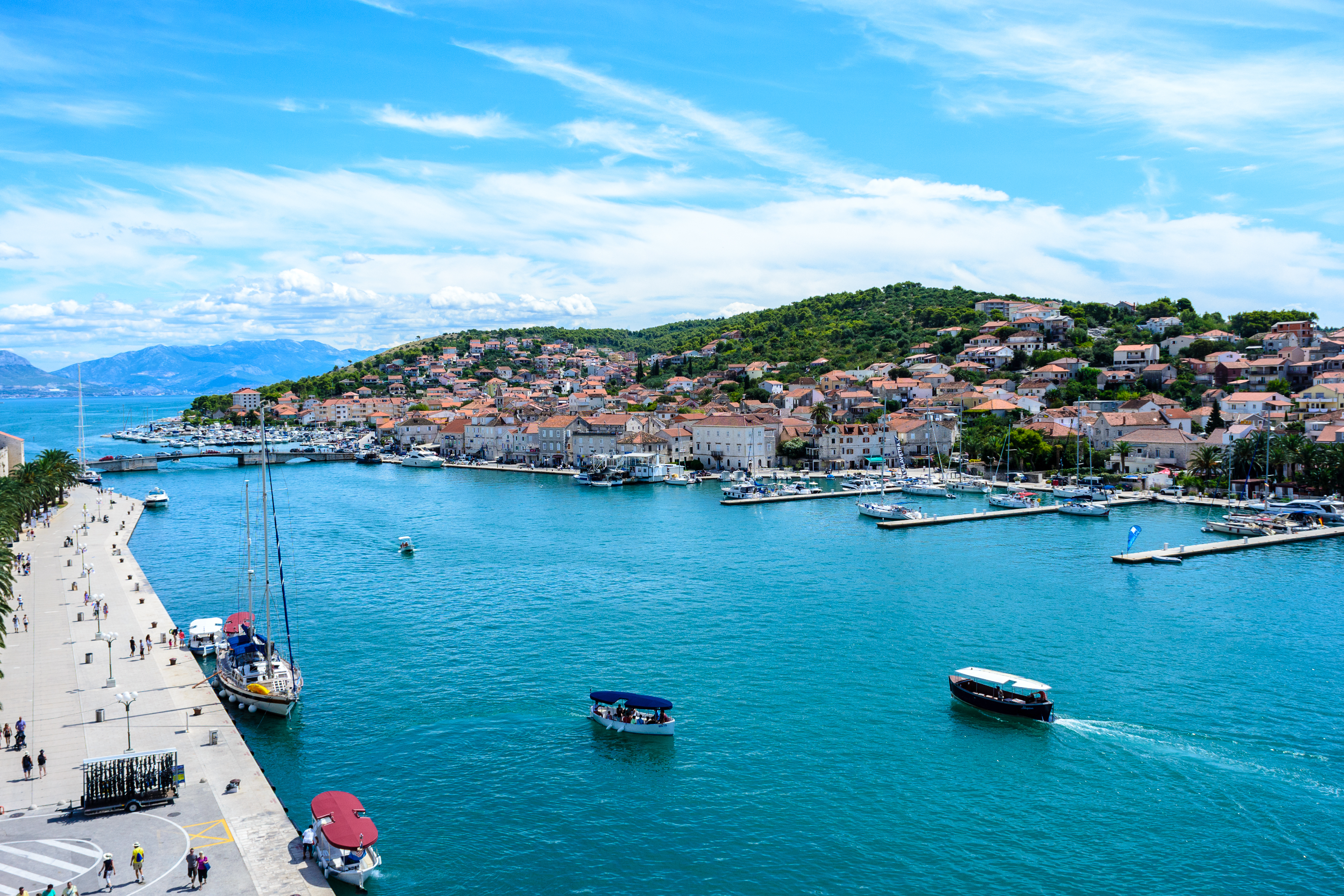
Trogir harbour

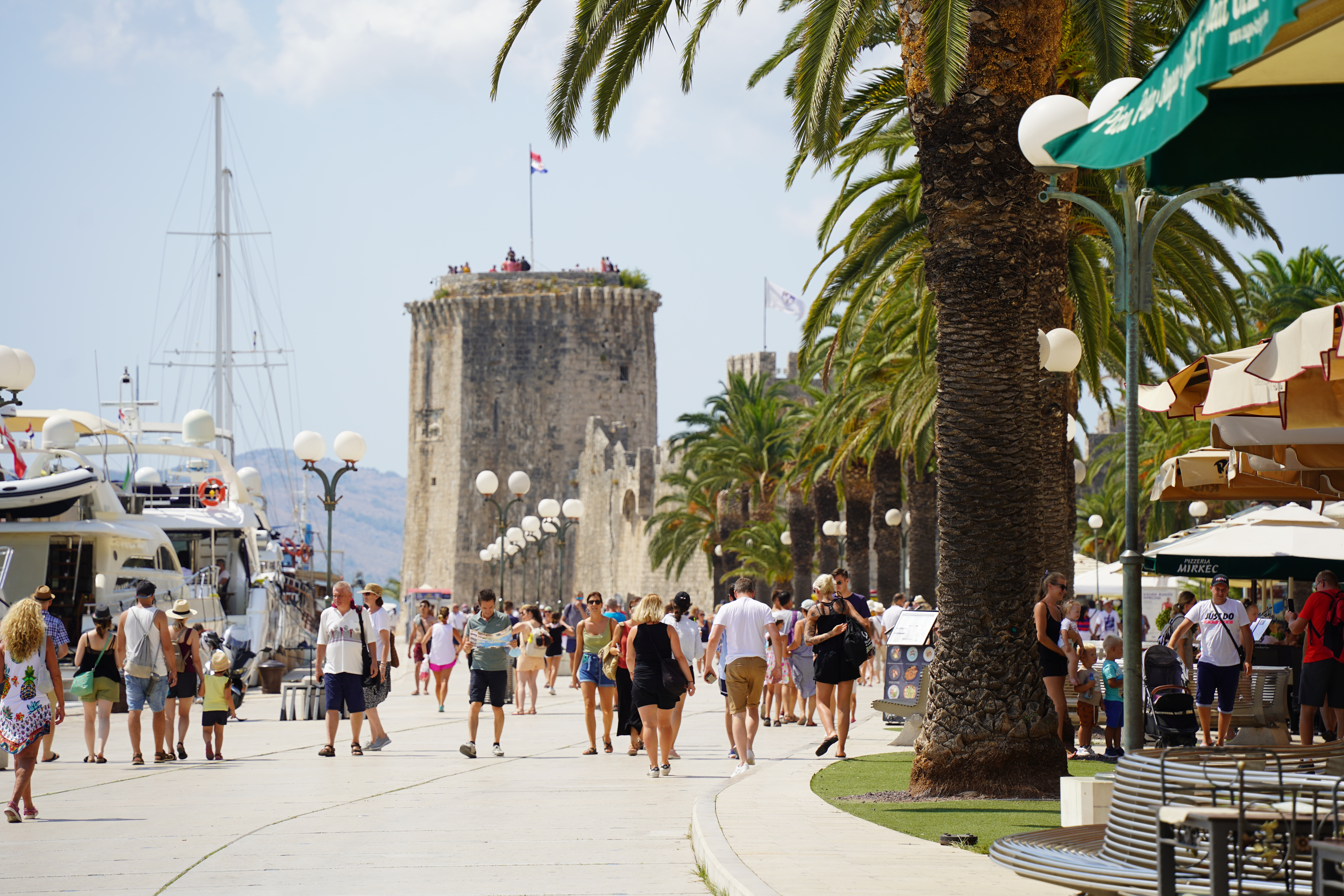
Trogir promenade

Tourism is the most important economic factor in the Trogir region, covering 50% of the municipal budget with more than 20,000 beds in hotels and private apartments. It is one of the fastest growing ports for sail-tourism in Croatia, and boasts two yacht marinas. There is also a strong fishing and agriculture tradition among the population in surrounding areas. The beginnings of tourism date back to the 1930s, when tourists from Czechoslovakia and other Central European countries began to arrive. It was often visited by prominent world figures from culture and politics, such as George Bernard Shaw and the English King Edward VIII, accompanied by Wallis Simpson.

The first tourist guide to the city’s landmarks was published in 1936. After the World War II, tourism revived once again, especially from the mid-1960s, when more substantial accommodation capacities began to be built.

The most important industry is shipbuilding, with shipyard "Trogir" established at the beginning of the 20th century. The shipyard has a capacity of two ships of 55,000 tons. Between 1990 and 2004, 93 ships were built in the shipyard.

Trogir has also been used as a location for several television productions; it notably featured in two 2010 episodes of the British TV series Doctor Who. Due to its Venetian architecture, it served as a double for 16th-century Venice in The Vampires of Venice, and as a double for 19th-century Provence in Vincent and the Doctor. It also doubled for 19th century Venice in the 2015 BBC miniseries Jonathan Strange & Mr Norrell, and was used for scenes set in the city of Qarth in the HBO series Game of Thrones.

== Sport in Trogir ==
- HNK Trogir (ex "Slaven") – football
- NK Trogir 1912 – football
- KK Trogir – basketball
- ŽRK Trogir – women's handball
- MRK Trogir – man's handball

== Notable people from Trogir ==
- Petar Berislavić, Croatian Ban
- Coriolano Cippico, nobleman
- Vinko Coce, singer and songwriter
- Ivan Duknović, sculptor
- Augustin Kažotić, Dominican and bishop
- Johannes Lucius, historian
- Faretta Radic, topmodel
- Radovan, sculptor and architect
- Mila Schön, fashion designer, true name Maria Carmen Nutrizio

== Views ==
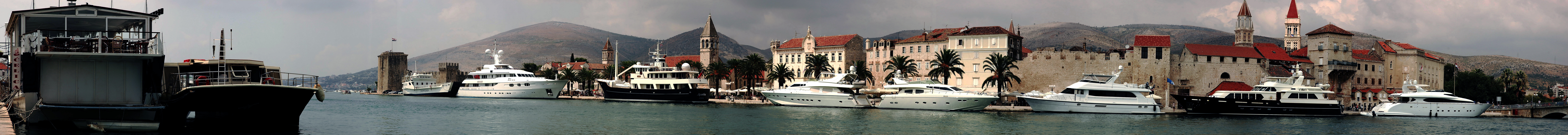
Panorama of Trogir harbour

.

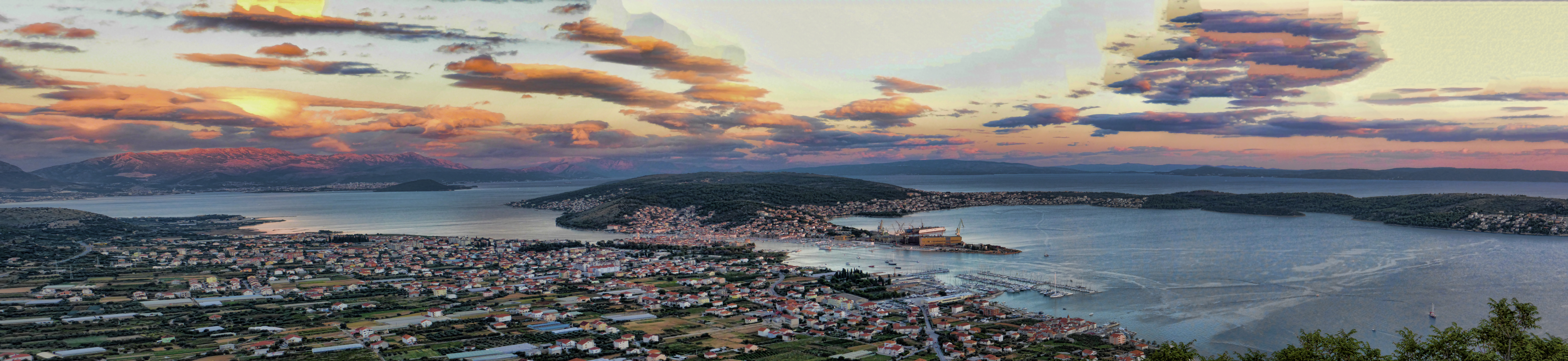
Trogir panorama from NW mountain belveder

== Climate ==
Climate in this area has mild differences between highs and lows, and there is adequate rainfall year-round. The Köppen Climate Classification subtype for this climate is "Csa" (Mediterranean climate/Mediterranean climate).

== International relations ==
=== Twin towns – sister cities ===
Trogir is twinned with:

- Ruse, Bulgaria
- Újbuda, Budapest, Hungary
- Lucera, Foggia, Apulia, Italy (since 1970)
- Vaterstetten, Bavaria, Germany (since 2009)
- Vukovar in Croatia (since 2011)
- Kruševac, Serbia
- Uzhhorod, Ukraine

== See also ==
- List of World Heritage Sites in Croatia
- List of ancient cities in Illyria
- Dalmatian City-States
- Stato da Màr
- Dalmatia
