= Okrug Gornji =

- Location within Croatia
- Coordinates: 43°29′41.1″N 16°15′55.8″E
- Country: Croatia
- County: Split-Dalmatia
- Municipality: Okrug

Area
  - Total: 7.1 km^{2} (2.7 sq mi)

Population (2021)
  - Total: 2,760
  - Density: 390/km^{2} (1,000/sq mi)
- Time zone: UTC+1 (CET)
  - Summer (DST): UTC+2 (CEST)

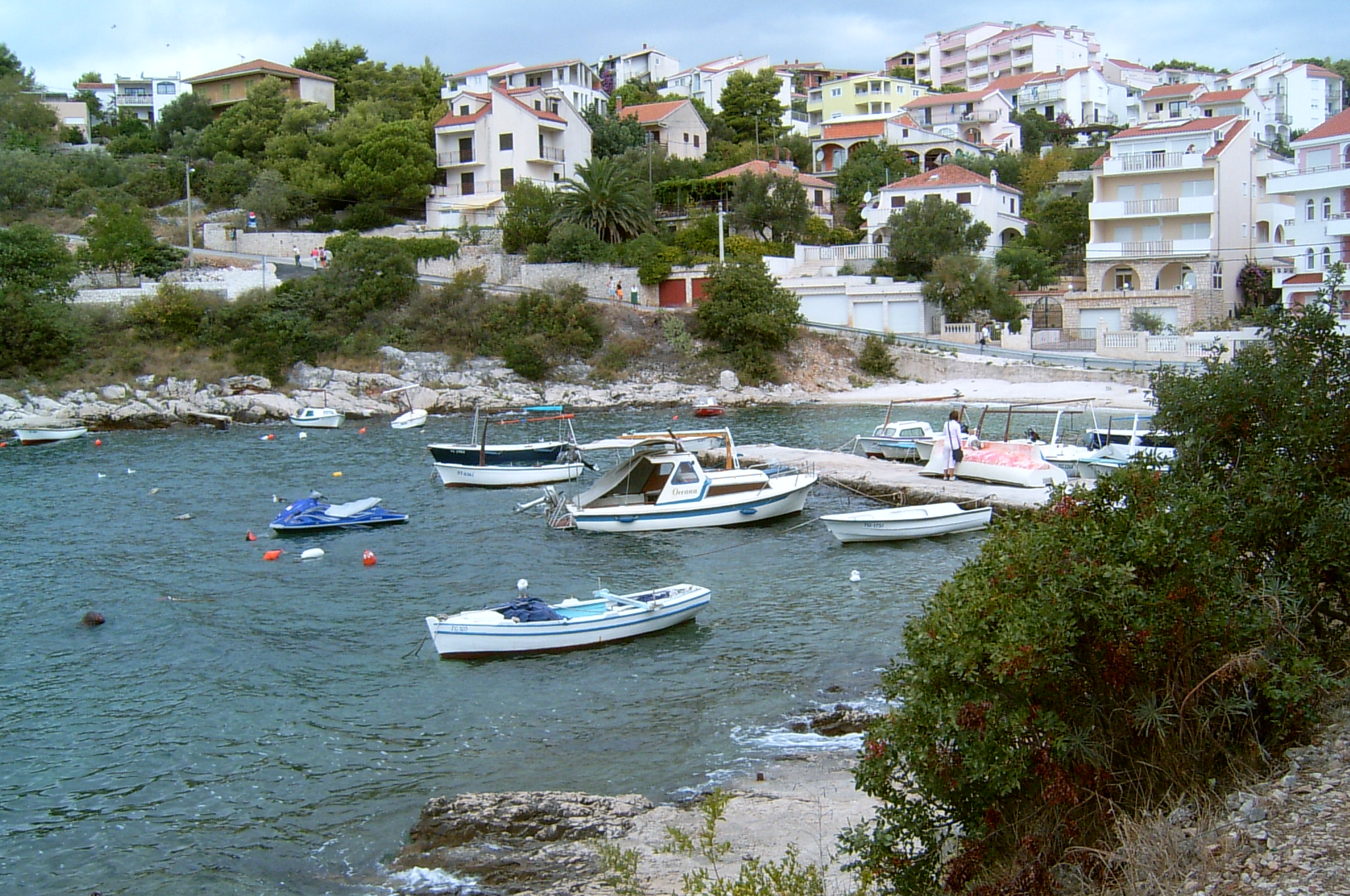
Okrug Gornji

Okrug Gornji is a village in the municipality of Okrug, Croatia, located on the western side of the island of Čiovo. Okrug Gornji (lit. 'Upper Okrug') is a traditional Dalmatian village, paired with Okrug Donji (lit. 'Lower Okrug').

Newly built holiday homes and hotels along the island's coast have linked Trogir and Okrug Gornji into a continuous urban and suburban area. Okrug Gornji is a traditional fishing harbor at the end of a beach, while Okrug Donji remains a separate village further west. The region has a mild Mediterranean climate, dense subtropical and Mediterranean vegetation, an archipelago of little islands, little bays and beaches.

There are many restaurants and taverns in Okrug Gornji and Donji with a varied choice of original Dalmatian specialities.

The average temperature is 16.3 °C (61 °F) and there is an average of 281 days per year with an average temperature above 10 °C (50 °F). Okrug is claimed to be one of the most attractive tourist destinations in Croatia with its 2,670 hours of sunshine per year.
