= Mastrinka =

Coordinates: 43°30′43″N 16°17′13″E

- Village
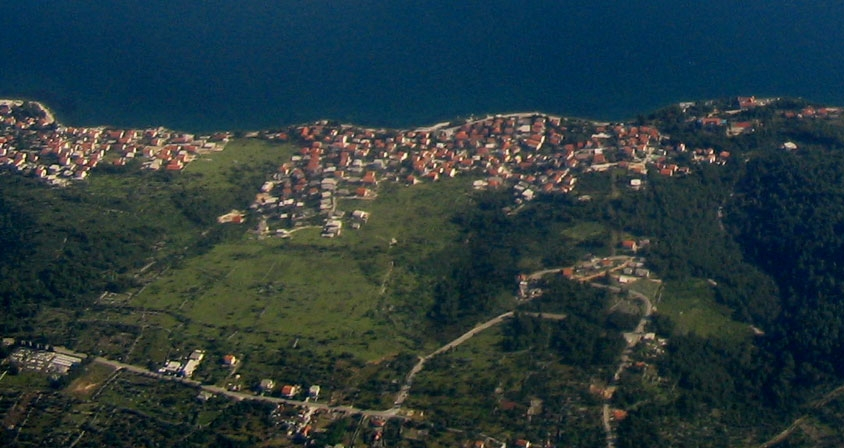
- Interactive map of Mastrinka
- Country: Croatia

Area
  - Total: 0.31 sq mi (0.8 km^{2})

Population (2021)
  - Total: 837
  - Density: 2,700/sq mi (1,000/km^{2})
- Time zone: UTC+1 (CET)
  - Summer (DST): UTC+2 (CEST)

Mastrinka is a village on the island of Čiovo in Croatia. It is connected by the D126 highway.
