= Faretta =

Faretta may refer to:

- Faretta (model) (born 1998), Croatian model
- Faretta v. California, a landmark 1975 US court case concerning self-representation
- Faretta warning, related legal term
- Ángel Faretta (born 1953), Argentine writer
