= Žedno =

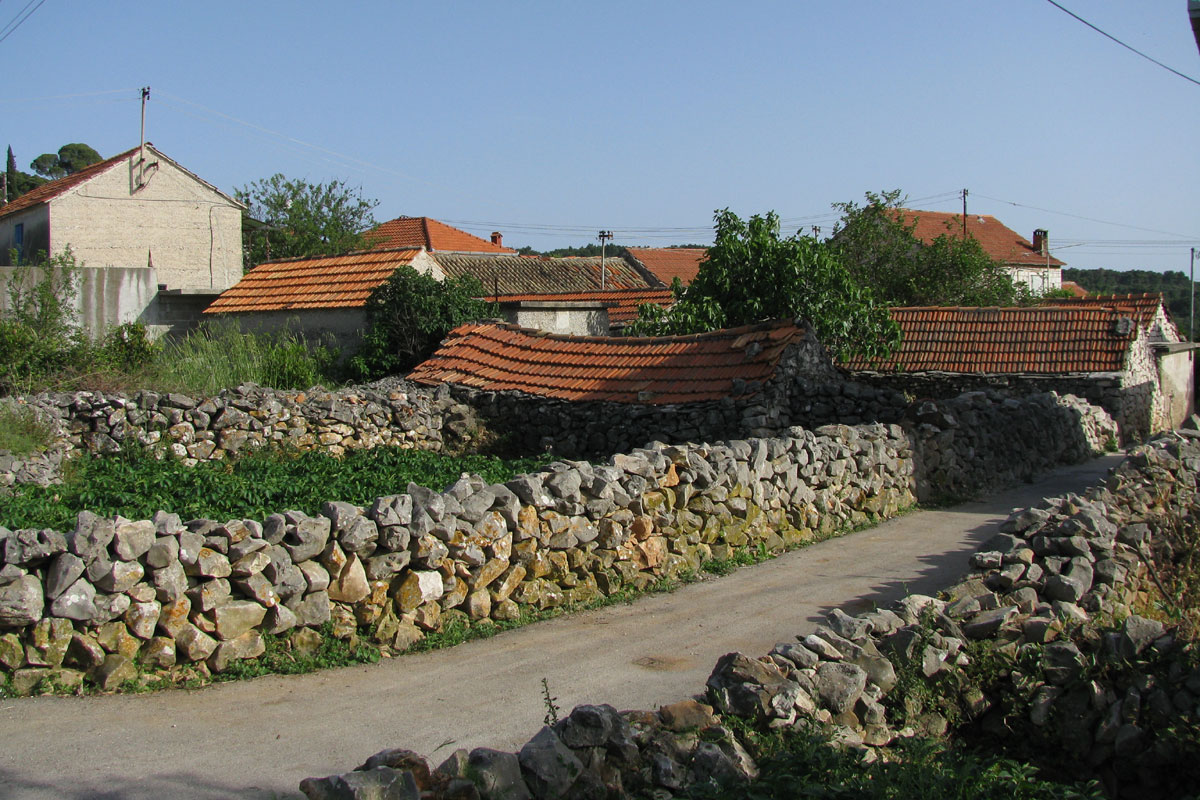

- Location within Croatia
- Coordinates: 43°31′N 16°17′E
- Country: Croatia
- County: Split-Dalmatia
- City: Trogir

Area
  - Total: 3.7 km^{2} (1.4 sq mi)

Population (2021)
  - Total: 152
  - Density: 41/km^{2} (110/sq mi)
- Time zone: UTC+1 (CET)
  - Summer (DST): UTC+2 (CEST)

Žedno is a village in the Čiovo island, near Split, Croatia. It is situated on the top of Čiovo island.

The village has a church and a kindergarten, but no school. Administratively, it is part of the city of Trogir.

It is connected by road to nearby villages of Mastrinka and Okrug Gornji.
