= Slatine =

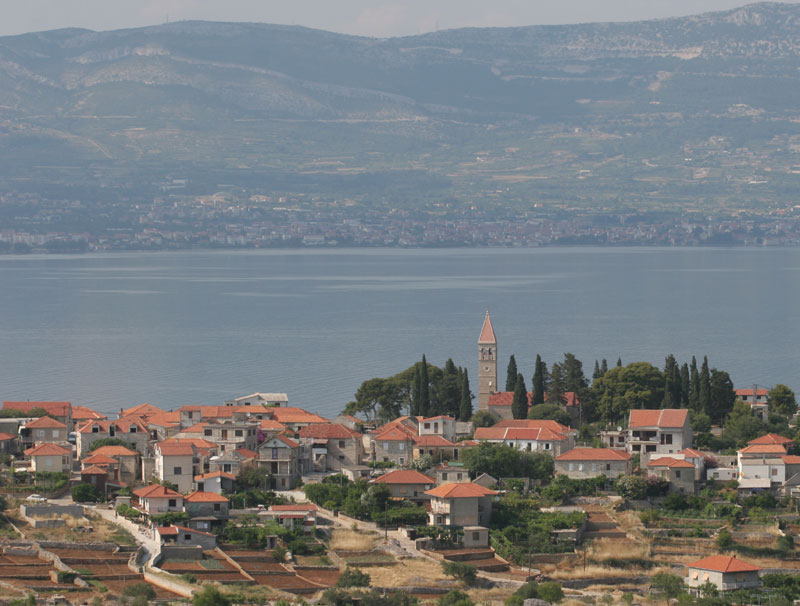

- Location within Croatia
- Coordinates: 43°30′N 16°20′E
- Country: Croatia
- County: Split-Dalmatia
- City: Split

Area
  - Total: 10.6 km^{2} (4.1 sq mi)

Population (2021)
  - Total: 924
  - Density: 87.2/km^{2} (226/sq mi)
- Time zone: UTC+1 (CET)
  - Summer (DST): UTC+2 (CEST)

Slatine is a village on Čiovo, an island in Split-Dalmatia County, Croatia. It is a small fishing and tourist village situated on the northeastern side of the island Čiovo, only 8 km from Trogir. It lies on the coast of Kaštela bay, opposite Split and peninsula Marjan, which are to the east. There are 1,106 inhabitants in the settlement (2011 census).

== Infrastructure ==
The village is in the Split metropolitan area with the city being responsible for the villages electricity, water and up until recently garbage disposal. a small road links Slatine with the rest of the island and the village is serviced by a bus link and in the summer months by a small ferry.

== Services ==
Slatine has a baker, a post office and a small supermarket. The village also had a small primary school, a kindergarten. The village is serviced by a local volunteer fire service and has a church and a monastery nearby. Slatine has numerous restaurants and beach bars giving it popularity with locals and tourist for its nightlife.

== Tourism ==
Slatine is popular with tourists particularly with locals and Germans. The village has a long beach and many hotel apartments.
