= Čiovo =

Island off the coast of Croatia

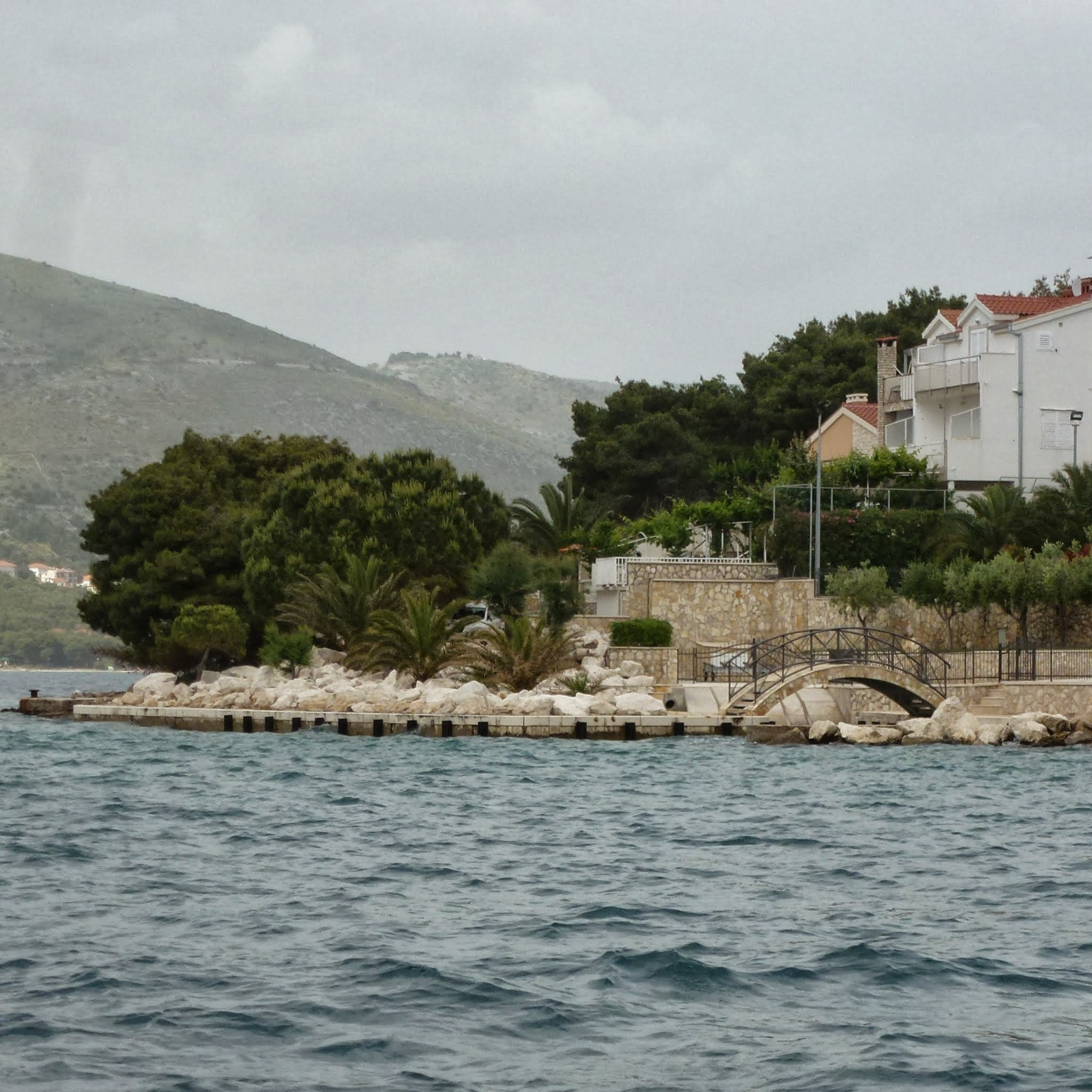
- Čiovo

- Location within Croatia
- Interactive map of Čiovo

Geography
- Location: Adriatic Sea
- Coordinates: 43°30′N 16°17′E
- Area: 28.8 km^{2} (11.1 sq mi)
- Length: 15.3 km (9.51 mi)
- Width: 3.5 km (2.17 mi)
- Highest elevation: 218 m (715 ft)
- Highest point: Rudine

Administration
- Croatia
- County: Split-Dalmatia County

Demographics
- Population: 5,908 (2011)
- Pop. density: 205.13/km^{2} (531.28/sq mi)

Čiovo (pronounced [tʃîɔv̞ɔ]) is an island located off the Adriatic coast in Croatia with an area of 28.8 square kilometres (11.1 sq mi) (length 15.3 km (9.5 mi), width up to 3.5 km (2.2 mi)), population of 5,908 inhabitants (2011). Its highest peak is the 218 m Rudine.

The centre of the island has geographical coordinates of 43°30′N 16°17′E, and the annual rainfall is about 900 mm (35 in).

== Geography ==
Čiovo is located in central Dalmatia, protecting the town of Trogir and Kaštela gulf. On its South Eastern part it is only two km from the Cape Marjan; on its Northern part it is connected to the mainland with a small bascule bridge in the old centre of Trogir. Trogir spread itself onto the island. Besides Trogir, there are several villages on the island including: Arbanija, Žedno, Okrug Gornji, Okrug Donji, Slatine and Prizidnica.

The vegetation is typically Mediterranean, consisting mainly in understory (holm oak, myrtle, wormwood, juniper etc.). On the northern side (exposed to the wind bura) are forests of pine and cypress. Major crops include olives, figs, almonds, vines and citrus fruit.

=== Connection to the mainland ===
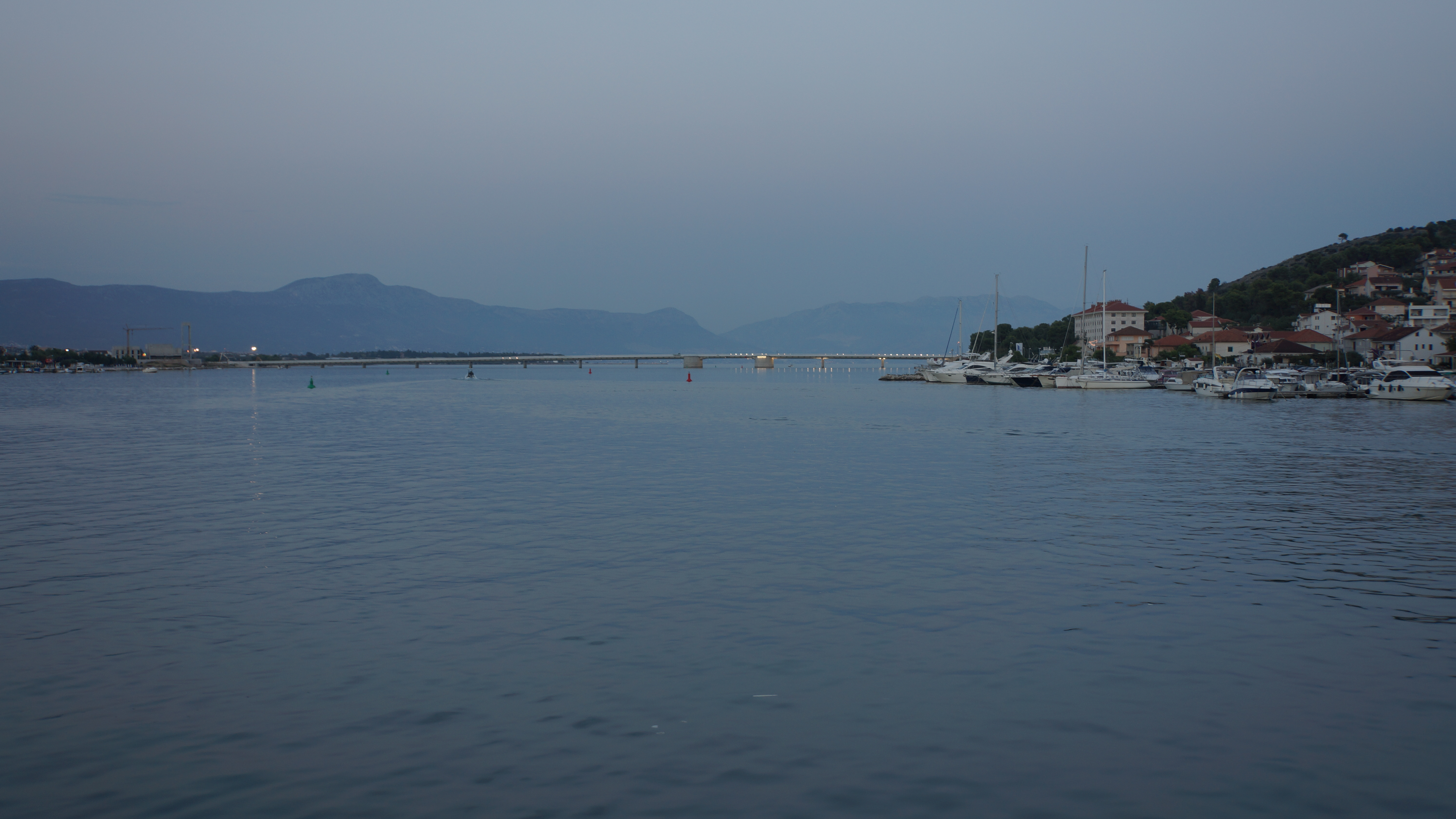
View towards the Čiovo—mainland bridge

Since 1964, the island has been connected by a bridge to Trogir which is itself connected to the mainland by another bridge. The development of tourism generated so much traffic that this connection suffered severe capacity shortages in high season.

The construction of a new bridge which connects Čiovo directly with the mainland began in February 2015. It was opened to traffic on July 17, 2018. The new 546.34 metres (1,792.5 ft) long bascule bridge is located about 1 kilometre (0.62 mi) east of the old one. Its navigational clearance when spans are closed is 6 metres (20 ft).

== History ==
The remains of forts and walls, as well as the artefacts dating back to the Antiquity indicate that, the Island of Čiovo, on the western side of which there is the present-day Municipality of Okrug, was already inhabited in the prehistoric times. During the period of the Roman Empire it served as a shelter for the exiled, and in the 5th century it also became an eremitic retreat. If we exclude the religious hermits who used to live next to picturesque churches that may still be seen today, during the second half of the early Middle Ages the Island was not inhabited. The situation changed in 1451 when, due to ever more frequent Ottoman sieges, the Republic of Venice, under the dominion of which the Town of Trogir had been since the year 1420, allowed the population of the Dalmatian interior to settle onto the nearby islands. In the Middle Ages, Čiovo had many villages and it was a place for lepers. Remains of the pre-Romanesque church of St. Peter have been found near Slatine, in the Supetar cove. The medieval church of St. Maurice (Sv. Mavro) has been preserved in Žedno and the pre-Romanesque church of Our Lady at the Sea (Gospa pokraj mora). The population of Čiovo increased in the 15th century through the settlement of refugees who fled from the Turks. Simultaneously, the suburban areas of Trogir also extended to Čiovo.

A small chapel named Lady of Prizidnice (Gospe od Prizidnice) located on the south side of the island can still be visited today. Owing to its hidden location, it was used as a safe place to hold ceremonies during the occupation of the Turks.
