= D76 road =

Road in Croatia

D76 state road

Route information
- Length: 28.34 km (17.61 mi)

Major junctions
- From: D8 in Baško Polje
- A1 in Zagvozd interchange D62 in Zagvozd
- To: Vinjani Donji border crossing to Bosnia and Herzegovina

Location
- Country: Croatia
- Counties: Split-Dalmatia
- Major cities: Imotski

Highway system
- Highways in Croatia

D76 is a state road in Croatia that connects Makarska Riviera to Imotski and Bosnia and Herzegovina. Furthermore, the road has junctions to major roads, namely A1 motorway in Zagvozd interchange, connecting to Split and Zagreb, and D62 state road, also in Zagvozd, which in turn connects to Šestanovac to the west and to Vrgorac to the east. The road is 28.34 km (17.61 mi) long.

The road, as well as all other state roads in Croatia, is managed and maintained by Hrvatske ceste, a state-owned company.

== Road junctions and populated areas ==
D33 junctions/populated areas
Type	Slip roads/Notes
	Vinjani Gornji border crossing to Bosnia and Herzegovina. The northern terminus of the road.
	Ž6185 to Gorni Vinjani.
	Imotski; Ž6156 to Imotski center and Proložac (to the west). D60 to Donji Vinjani border crossing to Bosnia and Herzegovina (to the east). D76 and D60 are concurrent south of the intersection.
	Glavina Donja; Ž6157 to Donji Proložac and Studenci.
	Ž6181 to Šumet
	Grubine; D60 to Cista Provo and Trilj (to the west). D76 and D60 are concurrent east of the intersection. Ž6183 to Ivanbegovina.
	Ž6178 to Medovdolac.
	L67151 to Slivno.
	Zagvozd; D62 to Vrgorac (to the east) and Šestanovac (to the west). D76 and D62 are concurrent for 800 meters.
	A1 Zagvozd interchange, to Split (to the west) and Ploče (to the east).
	The northern terminus of two-lane expressway.
	Sveti Ilija Tunnel through the Biokovo; The tunnel is 4,248 m (13,937 ft) long.
	Bast interchange
	The southern terminus of two-lane expressway.
	Topići interchange (accessible to northbound traffic only).
	Baška Voda interchange D8 to Omiš (to the northwest) and Makarska (to the southeast). The southern terminus of the road.

== See also ==
- Highways in Croatia
- Hrvatske autoceste
