= Župa (disambiguation) =

Župa is a Slavic administrative unit.

Župa may also refer to:

== Places ==
- Aleksandrovačka župa, a region in Serbia near Aleksandrovac
- Sirinićka župa, a region in Serbia / Kosovo
- Sredačka župa, a region in Serbia / Kosovo
- Župa, Split-Dalmatia County a village in Croatia
- Župa Srednja, a village in Split-Dalmatia County, Croatia
- Župa, Trbovlje, a village in Slovenia
- Župa, Trebinje, a village in Bosnia and Herzegovina
- Župa (Tutin), a village in Serbia
- Župa dubrovačka, a municipality in Croatia
- Župa, Danilovgrad, a village in Montenegro in Danilovgrad Municipality
- Centar Župa, a village and municipality in North Macedonia

== People ==
- Richard Župa (born 1998), a Slovak footballer

== Other uses ==
- FK Župa, a football club from Aleksandrovac, Serbia, in the 2007–08 Serbian League East
