= Serbian wine =

Wine making in Serbia

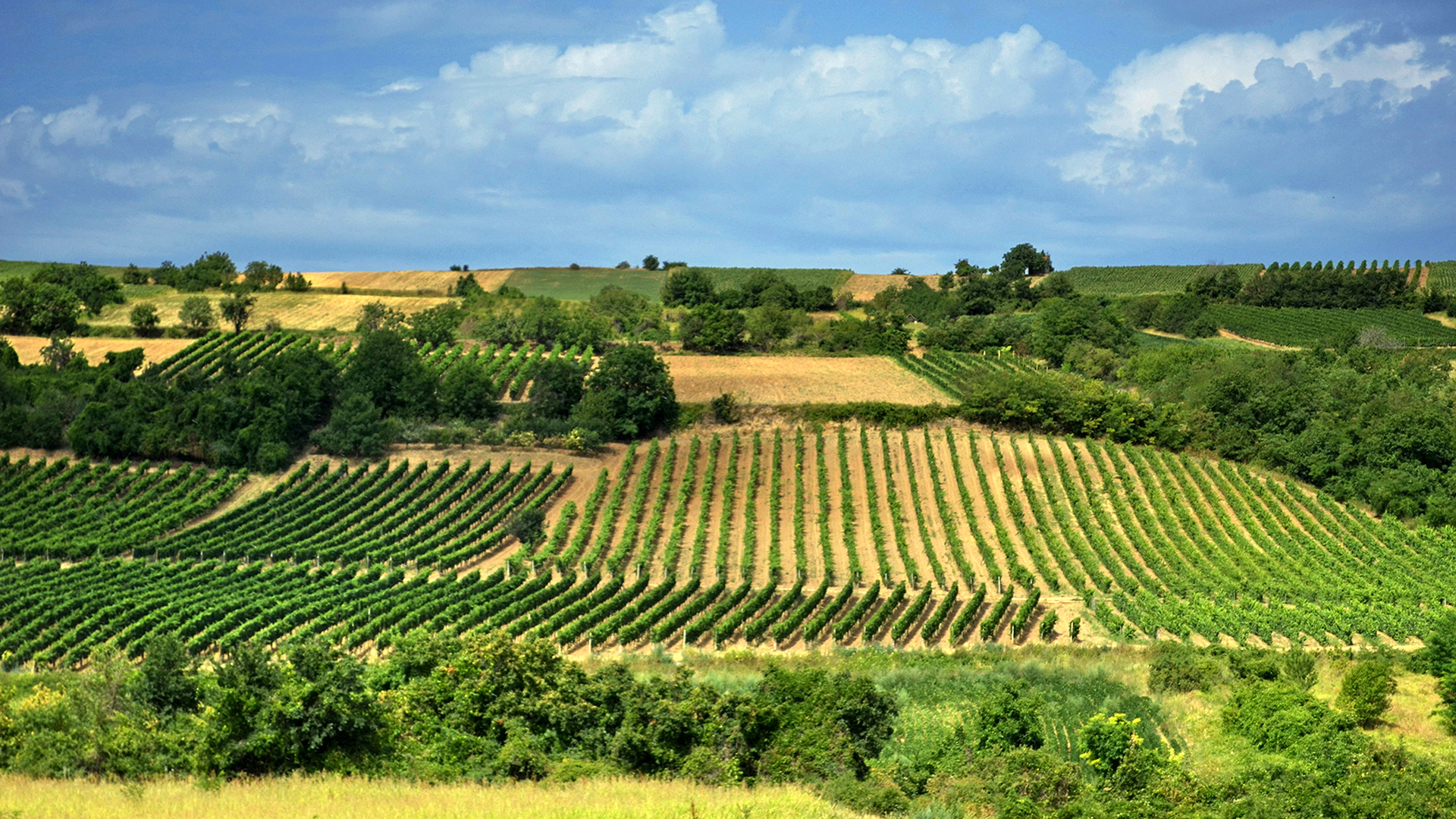
Fruška Gora vineyards

There are nearly 70,000 hectares of vineyards in Serbia, producing about 425,000 tons of grapes annually. The majority of Serbian wines are produced in local wineries.

The Serbian wine industry is showing signs of significant growth, as evidenced by In Vino, an annual international wine festival that has been held in Belgrade since 2004 on an annual basis. Also, since 2010, an annual international wine fair is held at the Belgrade Fair, named "Beo Wine Fair". As of 2019 Serbian wine production was in expansion.

Harvest season in Serbia begins in July (first grapes for eating fresh) and ends in October (last grapes for wine making).

== History ==
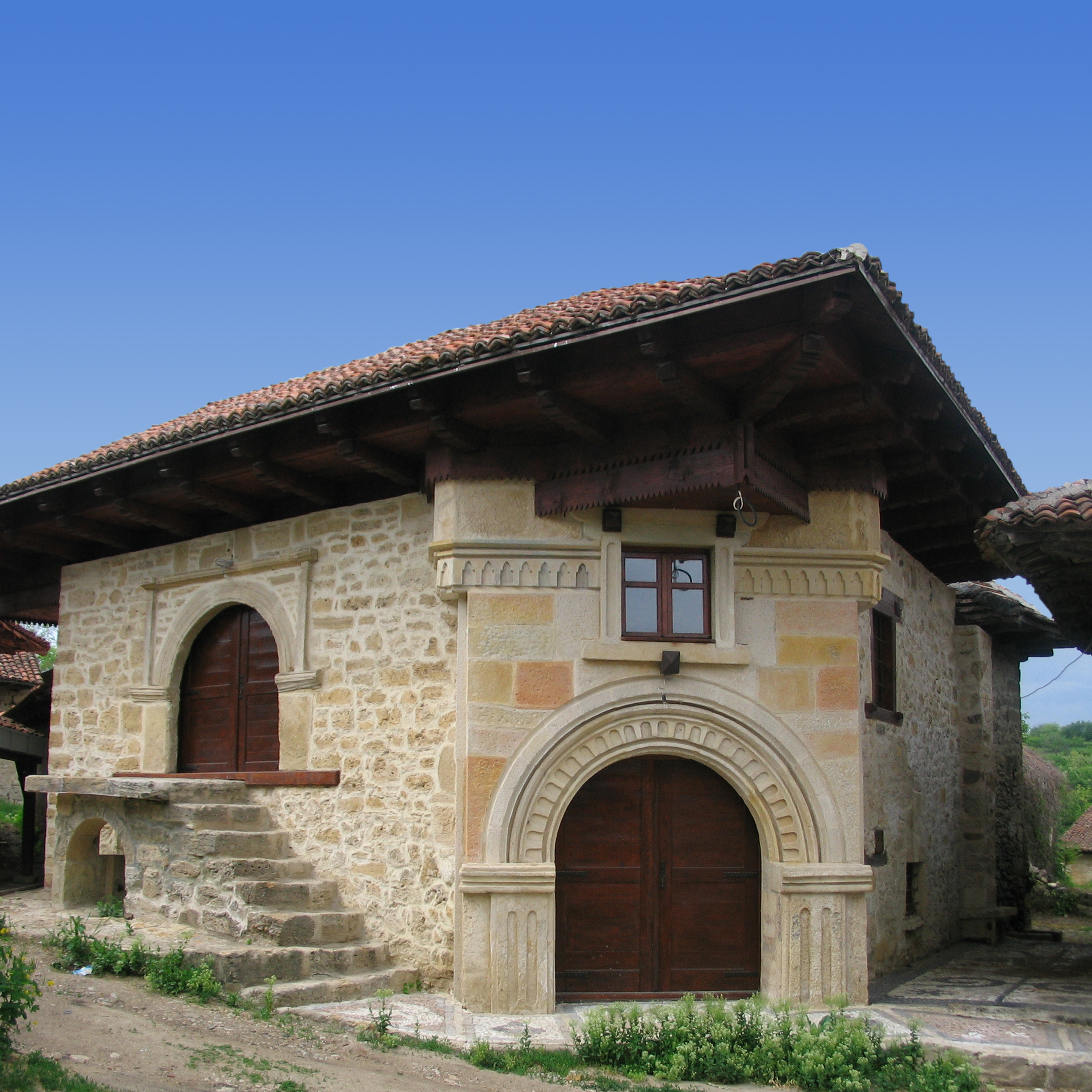
Rajac wine cellars near Negotin, eastern Serbia

The history of wine-making in Serbia dates back to prehistory. Viticulture was rich during the Roman period. Wine has been part of Serbian culture since the establishment of statehood, especially during the reign of the Nemanjić dynasty (XII-XIV century), which encouraged and promoted viticulture.

Former Yugoslavia was among the top-ten world wine producing countries. At its peak in the 1970s, it produced over 6 million hectolitres annually. However, largely due to the constraints of the socialist state, emphasis was put on quantity rather than quality. Many wines were mass-produced in large agricultural combines such as Navip and Rubin, with generally low quality standards in all stages of the wine-making process. The 1980s saw a sharp decline in production and exports, a development that continued in the 1990s with the Breakup of Yugoslavia and the subsequent breakdown of the Serbian economy.

But in the 2000s, Serbian winemaking started not only to recover, but to take a sharp and decisive turn towards quality and distinction. Numerous small and medium privately owned wineries entered the market, often run as family businesses, and with very high regard for standards of quality and taste.

Some near-forgotten traditions, such as Bermet of Sremski Karlovci, have been revived. The country's economic recovery also contributed to increase of domestic consumption. Wine production in 2004 was 1,550,000 litres. Wine consumption per capita is 16 liters (2006). Still, only 5% of domestic production is exported (2004-2007 data), most of it into neighboring countries, and chiefly in bulk. High-quality and quality wines constitute about 35% of production.

== Wine regions ==
Wine regions of Serbia (1970s classification)

The most important Serbian vineyard areas are situated in the Timok Valley (250 km to the east from Belgrade), in the area of Vršac (100 km to the north-east from Belgrade), on the slopes of Fruška Gora (80 km to the north-west from Belgrade), in the Subotica area (200 km to the north from Belgrade), Šumadija (100 km to the south-west from Belgrade) and Župa (230 km to the south-east from Belgrade).

According to a classification from the 1970s, Serbia has nine winemaking regions, each with several subregions:

1. Timok Valley region, in eastern Serbia, around the Timok River
  1. Negotin Valley subregion, centered in Negotin
  2. Knjaževac subregion
2. Nišava-South Morava region in southern Serbia, in valleys of eponymous rivers
  1. Aleksinac subregion
  2. Toplica subregion
  3. Niš subregion
  4. Nišava subregion
  5. Leskovac subregion
  6. Vranje subregion
3. West Morava region in central Serbia, along the lower flow of the river
  1. Čačak subregion
  2. Kruševac subregion
4. Šumadija-Great Morava region in central Serbia, the largest one by area
  1. Mlava subregion
  2. Jagodina subregion
  3. Belgrade subregion
  4. Oplenac subregion
5. Pocerina region, in western Serbia, around the mountain of Cer
6. Srem region, around Fruška Gora mountain in the province of Vojvodina
7. Banat region, around Vršac Mountains in eastern Vojvodina
  1. South Banat subregion
  2. North Banat subregion
8. Subotica-Horgoš region in northern Vojvodina
9. Kosovo (Metohija) region, in central Kosovo

In light of revival of winemaking industry of Serbia, Serbian Ministry of Agriculture in 2008 launched an initiative for reform of Serbian laws on winemaking, and re-classification of wine regions. A revised region classification was issued in 2013, defining 22 regions without subregions, and specifying their borders and characteristics in detail.

1. Pocerina–Valjevo region
2. Negotin Valley region
3. Knjaževac region
4. Mlava region
5. Toplica region
6. Niš region
7. Nišava region
8. Leskovac region
9. Vranje region
10. Čačak–Kraljevo region
11. Three Moravas region
12. Belgrade region
13. Šumadija region
14. Srem region
15. Subotica region
16. Telečka region
17. Potisje region
18. Banat region
19. South Banat region
20. Bačka region
21. North Metohija region (Kosovo)
22. South Metohija region (Kosovo)

== Varieties ==
Major varieties include the Belgrade Seedless, Prokupac, Sauvignon blanc, "Italian Riesling", Cabernet Sauvignon, Chardonnay, Pinot blanc and Pinot noir, Hamburg, Muscat, Afus Ali, Vranac, Tamjanika, Krstač, Smederevka, and Dinka. Some rare varieties survive in Serbia, too, such as the Muscat Crocant and Otelo.

The eldest authentic grape sorts are considered to be Prokupac and Tamjanika. Prokupac is the sort of red wines and was known even in early Middle Ages, while Tamjanika is a Muscat sort originated from Southern France, known in Serbia for more than 500 years.

White wines constitute about 64% of production, and red about 36%.

=== Red ===
Indigenous

- Prokupac, dates back to Middle Ages
- Vranac
- Krajinska Tamjanika Crna - Muscadel of roses black (indigenous in the Negotin Valley, but also other EU regions)
- Začinak

International

- Merlot
- Cabernet Sauvignon

=== White ===
Indigenous

- Smederevka
- Tamjanika, a Muscat sort that originated in Southern France, but has been grown in Serbia for more than 500 years.
- Kreaca, also known as Banatski Rizling
- Krstač
- Dinka

International

- Welschriesling known locally as Grašac.
- Chardonnay
- Sauvignon blanc
- Rhine

== See also ==
- Winemaking
- Agriculture in Serbia
