= Poljice =

Poljice, which translates as shelves from Serbo-Croatian, may refer to several places:

== Bosnia and Herzegovina ==
- Poljice, Drvar, village in the Drvar municipality
- Poljice, Foča, village in the Foča municipality
- Poljice, Kakanj, village in the Kakanj municipality
- Poljice, Lukavac, village in the Lukavac municipality
- Poljice, Maglaj, village in the Maglaj municipality
- Poljice Čičevo, village in the Trebinje municipality
- Poljice Popovo, village in the Trebinje municipality

== Croatia ==
- Poljice, Dubrovnik-Neretva County, village in the Konavle municipality
- Poljice, Lika-Senj County, village in the Udbina municipality

== See also ==
- Poljica (disambiguation)
