= Grubine =

- Location within Croatia
- Coordinates: 43.430055°N 17.163241°E
- Country: Croatia
- County: Split-Dalmatia
- Municipality: Podbablje

Area
  - Total: 3.8 km^{2} (1.5 sq mi)

Population (2021)
  - Total: 803
  - Density: 210/km^{2} (550/sq mi)
- Time zone: UTC+1 (CET)
  - Summer (DST): UTC+2 (CEST)

Grubine is a small settlement in the municipality of Podbablje, near the town of Imotski, Split-Dalmatia, Croatia.

== Geography ==
Grubine is 5 km away from the town of Imotski. It lies by the intersection of the two major state roads. (D60 Split - Lovreć - Imotski and D76 Baška Voda - Sveti Ilija Tunnel - Zagvozd - Grubine)

== History ==
The town is first mentioned in 1931. Nearby hamlets Mračaj, Matkovići, Žužuli, Vukovići, Karini and Jonjići have survived since 1718, after the Venetians liberated Imotski from Turkish occupation and returned it to Austrian Dalmatia. A population census was taken and the hamlet's names were added on to maps. At the time, the hamlets were assigned to the parish of St. Luke – Podbablje. The name Grubine originates from the name Gruba, a name common on medieval gravestones, called stećci.

The patroness of Grubine is Our Lady - Queen of Croats in whose honor residents established a new church in 1995.

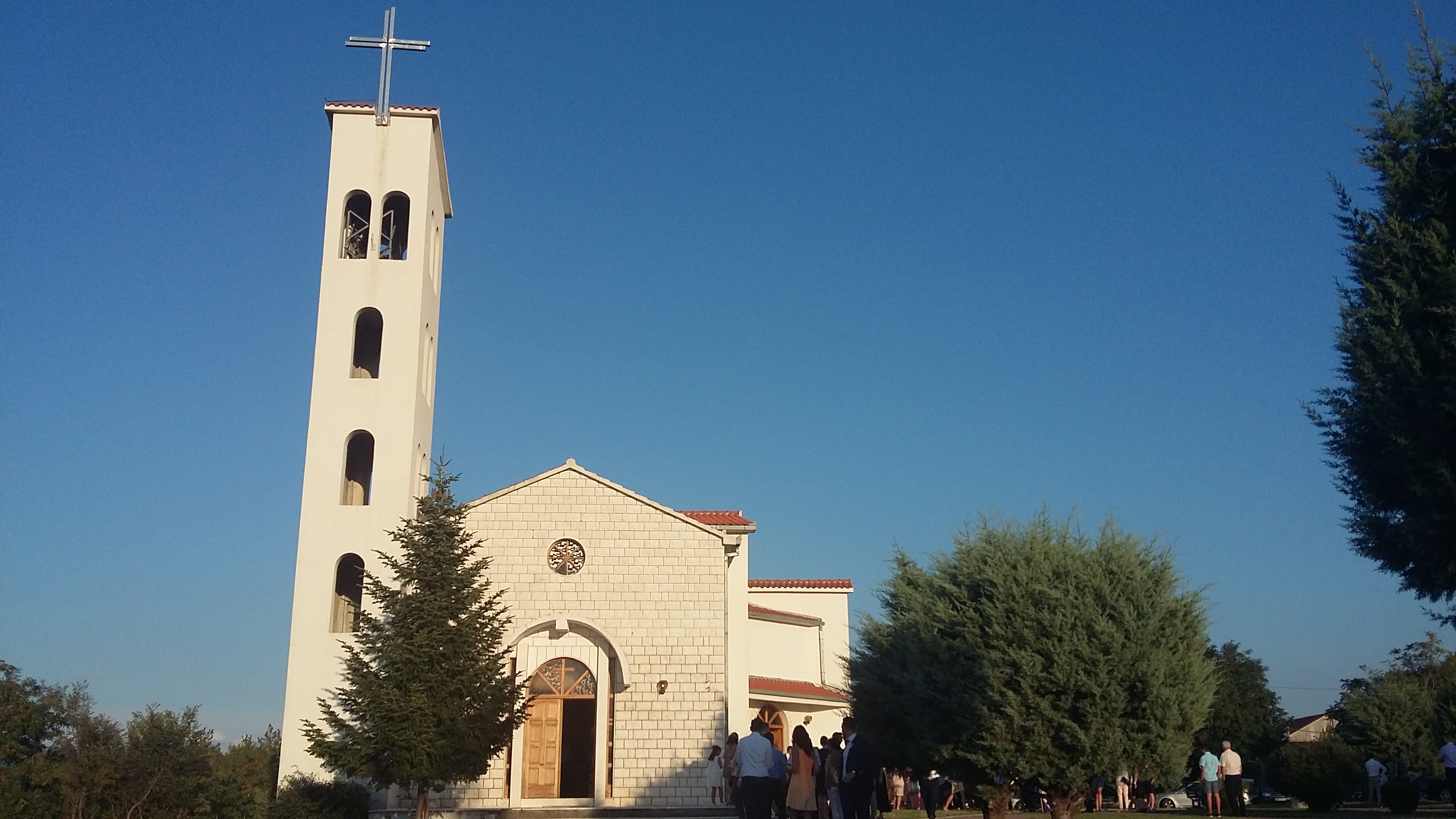
Our Lady - Queen of Croats church

== Population ==
Grubine is the largest settlement in the Podbablje municipality with a population of 1,010 since 2011.

== Economy ==
Construction has long been the main occupation, especially due to the construction of the Dalmatina highway and Sveti Ilija Tunnel resulting in numerous enterprises in the construction business.

Given its position close to the fields of Imotski, Grubine inherited an agricultural tradition in growing grapes and vegetables. After the completion of the tunnel through the mountain Biokovo in 2013, the Imotski county has become well-connected to the Makarska Riviera. This stimulated touristic development in Grubine, making tourism the fastest growing industry there. For instance, before the tunnel opening Grubine counted zero accommodation units, while in 2016, there were 12 holiday villas with pools along with 2 apartments. The guests mostly come from West and North Europe.

== Education ==
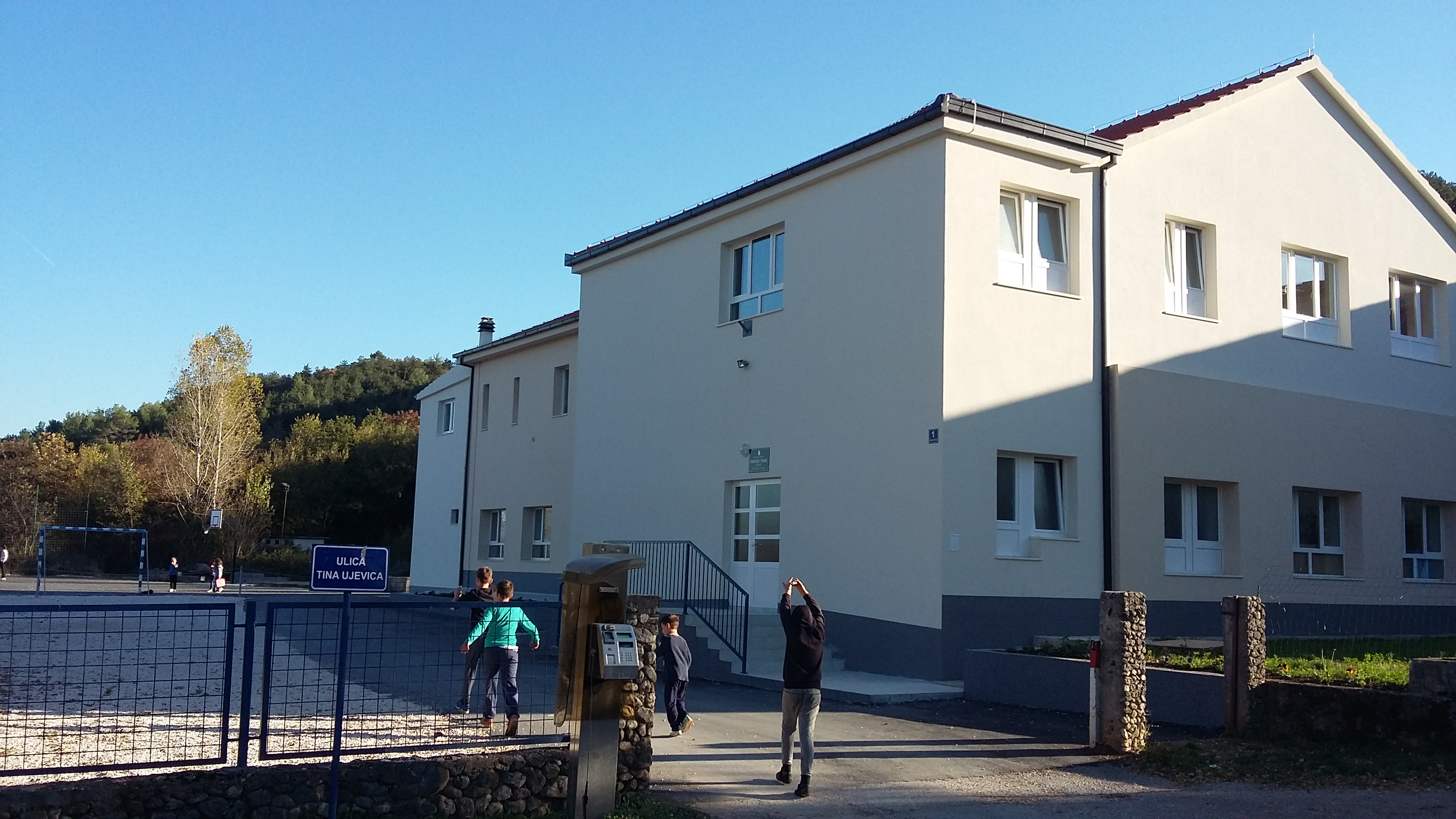
District school in Mračaj

The 4-year district school is situated In the hamlet of Mracaj and is part of the “Tin Ujević“ Elementary school in Krivodol. The district school was refurbished in 2016, using European Union funds. Part of the building belongs to a preschool kindergarten. Grubine inherits a long education tradition starting in 1931.

== Culture ==
Various associations take care of the development, culture, tradition, sport and ecology of Grubine. The Grubine Sport Society (Športsko Društvo Grubine ŠDG) was established in 2007. Every summer it organizes a football tournament called “Kraljica Hrvata“ (The Queen of Croats) where teams compete from across Dalmatia and near Herzegovina compete. A part of the tournament is a football competition between Grubine's hamlets called The Tournament of Surnames.

The HKUD Kolajna association was established in the 1980s when it initiated the Grubine Carnival on the last weekend of Lent joining the old carnival tradition of the Imotski County. It organizes carnivals with a hiatus during the Independence War in the early 90s. It cooperates with the ŠDG Society in carnival organisation. The HKUD Kolajna honors traditions by organising ganga festivals and klapa concerts, among others.

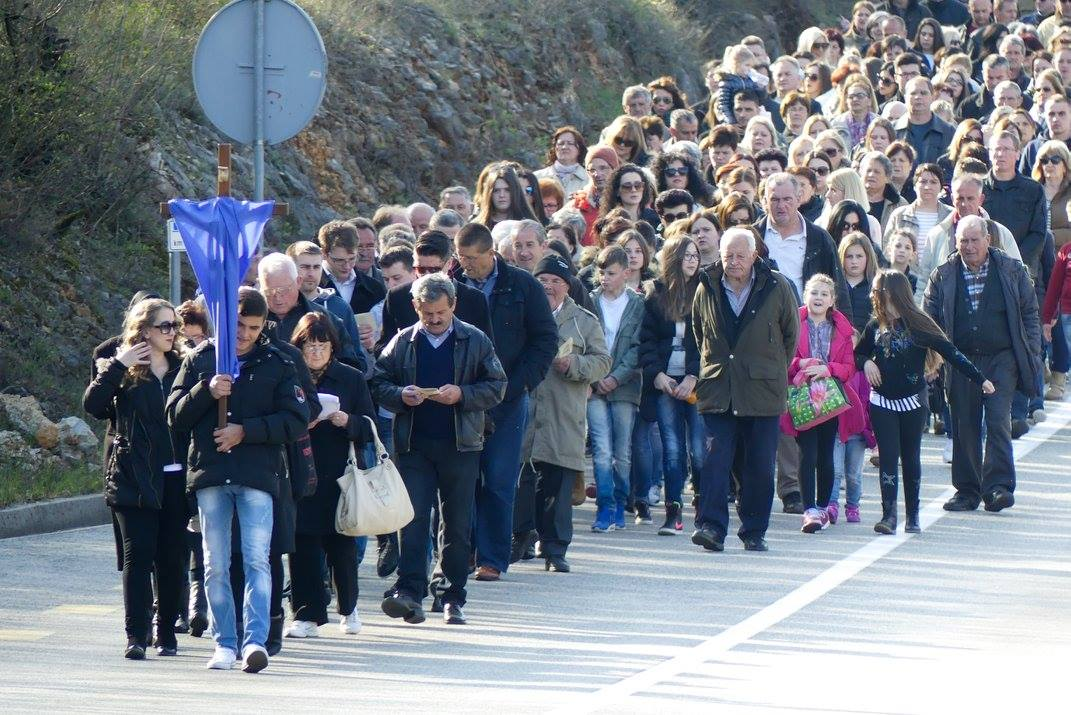
Great Friday

The KUD Imotske Golubice inherits traditional kantanje and ganga singing along with traditional costumes and customs. Progress in association work was done with the huge effort of Neda Kujundžić Turkina. The Ecological society Bunar (The Well) cares for the purity of the place, protection of nature and the environment. The special focus of this society is the Vrljika river.

Grubine is "famous" for Mercedes-Benz cars. This place with only a thousand people operate more than 200 Mercedes-Benz vehicles, both cars and trucks. Many residents from Grubine migrated to Germany seeking better jobs, mostly in the 1970s and then returned with new vehicles.

Krčevac Spring is located in Matkovici hamlet and is famous for its endemic olms (Čovječja ribica). The olm can be found on the Podbablje municipally coat of arms and is also the symbol of Matkovići hamlet.

A traditional folk manifestation called Žužulijada is held every summer in Žužuli hamlet where residents split into two teams - “Upper road“ and “Beneath road“, which compete in old folk disciplines.

In 2016, the “Magic Time Vinyl Festival“ was organised for the first time. This Croatian Festival of old record boards and music antiquities takes place on the Vrljika river bank between vineyards and mills. The Festival lasts all day, featuring disco and dance music.

During the Independence War in Croatia, Grubine paid a large price in men. Mladen Jonjić, Vinko Žužul, Josip Žužul, Ivan Karin and Marijan Jonjić gave their lives for Croatian freedom. Their names can be found on the memorial at the “Our Lady – Queen of Croats“ church entrance, among the names of 15 fallen heroes from the Podbablje municipality.
