= D76 =

D76 may refer to:

- D. 76, Aria "Pensa, che questo istante" ('Pensa, che questo istante') for bass and piano by Franz Schubert
- D76 road, a state road in Croatia
- HMS Virago (D76) or HMS Virago (R75), V-class destroyer of the British Royal Navy that saw service during World War II
- HMS Witherington (D76), Admiralty modified W-class destroyer built for the Royal Navy
- Photographic developer
