= Glavina Gornja =

Settlement in Split-Dalmatia County, Croatia

- Settlement
- Interactive map of Glavina Gornja
- Location of Glavina Gornja in Croatia
- Coordinates: 43°28′23″N 17°12′20″E
- Country: Croatia
- County: Split-Dalmatia
- City: Imotski

Area
  - Total: 10.4 km^{2} (4.0 sq mi)

Population (2021)
  - Total: 302
  - Density: 29.0/km^{2} (75.2/sq mi)
- Time zone: UTC+1 (CET)
  - Summer (DST): UTC+2 (CEST)
- Postal code: 21260 Imotski
- Area code: +385 (0)21

Glavina Gornja is a settlement in the City of Imotski in Croatia. In 2021, its population was 302.

== Demographics ==
Glavina Gornja: Population trends 1931–2021
v

population		414	429	442	275	274	271	234	283	302
	1931	1948	1953	1961	1971	1981	1991	2001	2011	2021

Note:In 1857 and from 1880 to 1931, the population data were contained in the settlement of Glavina Donja, and in 1869 in the settlement of Imotski. From 1948 to 1961, it was reported as part of the settlement. Sources: Croatian Bureau of Statistics publications
