= Medvidovića Draga =

Settlement in Split-Dalmatia County, Croatia

- Settlement
- Interactive map of Medvidovića Draga
- Location of Medvidovića Draga in Croatia
- Coordinates: 43°26′04″N 17°15′01″E
- Country: Croatia
- County: Split-Dalmatia
- City: Imotski

Area
  - Total: 1.0 km^{2} (0.39 sq mi)

Population (2021)
  - Total: 326
  - Density: 330/km^{2} (840/sq mi)
- Time zone: UTC+1 (CET)
  - Summer (DST): UTC+2 (CEST)
- Postal code: 21260 Imotski
- Area code: +385 (0)21

Medvidovića Draga is a settlement in the City of Imotski in Croatia. In 2021, its population was 326.

== Demographics ==
Medvidovića Draga: Population trends 1971–2021
v

population	229	323	377	382	385	326
	1971	1981	1991	2001	2011	2021

Note:Since 1991, it has been included in population censuses as an independent settlement formed by separating part of the area of Glavina Donja, which also contains data from 1857 to 1961. Sources: Croatian Bureau of Statistics publications
