= Veljko Kadijević =

Yugoslav military commander and politician

- Вељко Кадијевић

5th Federal Secretary of People's Defense of Yugoslavia
- In office 15 May 1988 – 8 January 1992
- Preceded by: Branko Mamula
- Succeeded by: Blagoje Adžić (acting)

Personal details
- Born: 21 November 1925 Imotski, Kingdom of Serbs, Croats and Slovenes (modern Croatia)
- Died: 2 November 2014 (aged 88) Moscow, Russia
- Citizenship: Yugoslavia and Russia
- Party: League of Communists of Yugoslavia (until 1990); League of Communists – Movement for Yugoslavia (1990–1994)
- Spouse: Ozrenka Borić
- Children: 1

Military service
- Allegiance: Yugoslavia
- Branch/service: Yugoslav People's Army
- Years of service: 1943–1992
- Rank: General of the Army
- Unit: JNA Ground Forces
- Commands: Yugoslav People's Army
- Battles/wars: World War II in Yugoslavia, Ten-Day War, Croatian War of Independence

Veljko Kadijević (Serbian Cyrillic: Вељко Кадијевић; 21 November 1925 – 2 November 2014) was a Serbian general of the Yugoslav People's Army (JNA). He was the Minister of Defence in the Yugoslav government from 1988 until his resignation in 1992, which made him de facto commander-in-chief of the JNA during the Ten-Day War in Slovenia and the initial stages of the Croatian War of Independence.

== Early life and education ==
Veljko Kadijević was born on 21 November 1925 in the village of Glavina Donja near Imotski, at the time in the Kingdom of Serbs, Croats and Slovenes. His father Dušan Kadijević was a Serb and his mother Janja Patrlj was an ethnic Croat. Kadijević self-declared as a "pro-Yugoslav Serb".

He joined the Yugoslav Partisans in 1941, following the Axis invasion of Yugoslavia during World War II. In 1943, he joined the Communist Party of Yugoslavia (KPJ). He was given the task of performing important duties almost immediately. He remained an active soldier after the war and graduated from the Military Academy in Belgrade and the CGSC in Fort Leavenworth, Kansas.

== Career ==
Kadijević became the fifth Minister of Defence of the Socialist Federal Republic of Yugoslavia on 15 May 1988. Following the collapse of the League of Communists of Yugoslavia, he was one of the founders of the party called League of Communists – Movement for Yugoslavia. In May 1991 he stated that if federal and republic officials "failed to ensure peace, the Yugoslav armed forces could efficiently do so themselves." After resigning from his post at federal secretary of people's defence on 6 January 1992, Kadijević retired to live in Serbia.

The International Criminal Tribunal for the former Yugoslavia (ICTY) tried to contact him in the spring of 2001. He was to be called as witness, he however fled to Moscow the next day. He applied for refugee status in 2005 and received Russian citizenship on 13 August 2008 by decree of president Dmitry Medvedev.

=== Croatian indictment ===
The first indictment for Kadijević was issued in November 1992 in Bjelovar, the second one in 2002 in Vukovar and the third one in May 2006 by Osijek-Baranja County's attorney general. On 21 March 2007, the Croatian Ministry of the Interior issued an arrest warrant for Kadijević for "war crimes against the civilian population". Interpol issued an arrest warrant on 23 March. After Kadijević received Russian citizenship the Croatian Government sent a request to Russia for his extradition.

According to Marko Attila Hoare, a former employee at the ICTY, an investigative team worked on indictments of senior members of the "joint criminal enterprise", including Milošević, Kadijević, Blagoje Adžić, Borisav Jović, Branko Kostić, Momir Bulatović, among others. However, upon Carla del Ponte's intervention, these drafts were rejected, and the indictment limited to Milošević.

=== November 2007 public appearance ===
Public interest in Kadijević and his whereabouts intensified again in 2007. It was speculated at the time that he was living in Florida, United States, which proved to be false.

In March 2007, the Croatian press reported seemingly contradictory information: that Kadijević was working as a special counsel to the U.S. Army in search for bunkers in Iraq in Moscow as a guest of Dmitry Yazov. On 26 March 2007, the Croatian news portal published an interview with Kadijević in which he confirmed that he is a military adviser to the Coalition in Iraq, but stated that it "doesn't mean that he is permanently located there", without further comment or explanation.

In early October 2007 Kadijević surfaced in Moscow where he attended the presentation of his latest book Kontraudar: Moj pogled na raspad Jugoslavije ("Counterattack: My View on the Breakup of Yugoslavia"). After that, the 81-year-old Kadijević gave interviews to both Serbian and Croatian media. On 9 November 2007 he was interviewed by journalist Olivera Jovićević from Serbian public broadcaster RTS and the interview aired 13 November 2007 in prime time as a special edition of her Upitnik programme. The very next day, 14 November, Croatian Radiotelevision's journalist Josip Sarić conducted an interview with Kadijević.

In those interviews Kadijević stated that he had lived in Russia since 2000 as a refugee. He said he found out about the Vukovar massacre only after retiring because the head of intelligence, General Aleksandar Vasiljević, did not inform him of this event. Kadijević claimed neither he nor the JNA committed any war crimes in the former Yugoslavia as it was the only legal armed force at the time. He stated that he and the JNA tried to prevent illegal armaments and to defend Yugoslavia from emerging separatist paramilitaries and dismissed the ICTY as a political institution, whose legitimacy he did not recognize.

He added that neither he nor the JNA ever considered orchestrating a military coup to solve the Yugoslav crisis. This contrasted with comments by Yugoslavia's president Borisav Jović who claimed Kadijević and the army suggested a coup as a way out of the crisis but then changed their minds four days later.

Kadijević's response to this was that "Jović is lying". Kadijević proceeded to mention a March 1991 meeting in Jović's office two days after the 9 March 1991 protests organized by Vuk Drašković on the streets of Belgrade to which Kadijević had been invited by Slobodan Milošević where, according to Kadijević, Milošević requested that the army take control of the country through a military coup. Kadijević's apparent response was informing Milošević that he could not make such a decision by himself, and that he would discuss the request with army leaders and later inform Jović's office about their decision. Kadijević said their decision was against the putsch and he informed Jović's office in writing. Jović for his part, claims such a document does not exist.

Political offices
Preceded by Branko Mamula	Federal Secretary of People's Defence of Yugoslavia; 15 May 1988 – 8 January 1992	Succeeded by Blagoje Adžić; Acting
