= Rašćane =

Rašćane may refer to:

== Places ==
- Rašćane, Vrgorac, a village near Vrgorac in Croatia
- Rašćane Gornje, a village near Zagvozd in Croatia
- Rašćani, Tomislavgrad, a village near Tomislavgrad in Bosnia and Herzegovina

== Other ==
- Rašćane Viaduct, a viaduct located on the motorway between Zagvozd and Ravča in Croatia
