= Ivan Bušić Roša =

Croatian guerilla commander (1745–1783)

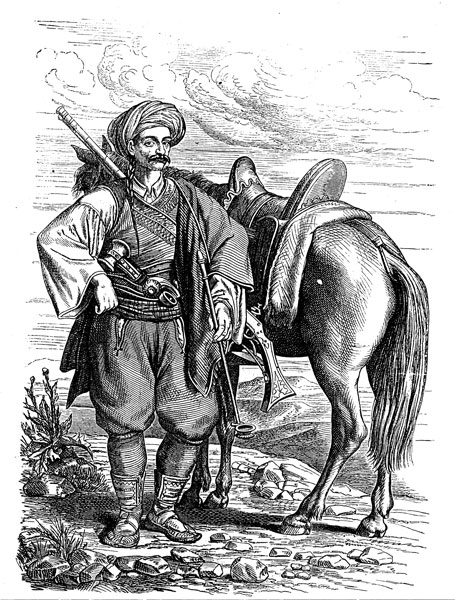
Harambaša was a senior commander of a hajduk band from Dalmatia in 19 century.

Ivan Bušić (1745–1783), nicknamed Roša (from Italian rosso, "red", as in red-haired) was a hajduk (guerilla fighter) harambaša (commander) from the Imotski frontier (Imotska krajina, in modern Croatia), who served the Republic of Venice against the Ottomans in Dalmatia, Bosnia and Herzegovina.

== Life ==
According to his descendant, Bruno Bušić, he was Croat, evident from the poem La trnka urekla Hrvata. He was born in Donji Vinjani around 1745. In the beginning, he was in good relation with Orthodox people, and his first harambaša was Sočivica, an Orthodox. Roša had 33 fighters, one of whom was a Muslim, Mubašir, "who was not a bad man". As a hajduk, he fought against the Ottoman Empire, traveling along Dalmatia, Bosnia and Herzegovina.

According to contemporary annals, he persecuted more Orthodox (Serbs) than Turks, because he "couldn't listen or look at them, so he killed many of them".

He was killed on April 1, 1783, by a man named Krešić, on Ilijino polje ("Ilija's Field") somewhere between Stolac and Popovo Polje.

== Legacy ==
In 1977, Croatian dissident in emigration and Bušić family member Bruno Bušić wrote a book Ivan Bušić-Roša, Hajdučki Harambaša, detailing the life and legend of Ivan Bušić-Roša. Today, there are many traditional folk-songs and gusle poems dedicated to Roša. Yugoslav literature Nobel prize winner Ivo Andric wrote a short story 'Confession' ('Ispovijed'), describing fictional Catholic deathbed confession of Roša.
