= Neda Ukraden =

Serbian-Croatian singer (born 1950)

- Ukraden in 1978
- Born: 16 August 1950 (age 76); Imotski, PR Croatia, Yugoslavia
- Citizenship: Croatia; Bosnia; Serbia
- Years active: 1967–present
- Children: 1
- Musical career
- Genres: Pop-folk; folk; turbo-folk; dance; pop (early)
- Instruments: Vocals; guitar
- Labels: RTV Ljubljana; Jugoton; ZKP RTVL; Diskoton; Komuna; PGP RTB; PGP RTS; Grand Production; City Records; Sarajevo Disk; Hit Records; Croatia Records

Neda Ukraden (born 16 August 1950) is a Yugoslav singer. Her professional career stretches back to 1967 and has collectively released thirty studio albums. With collective sales of over five million records, Ukraden is recognised as one of the most successful artists from former Yugoslavia.

== Personal life ==
Ukraden was born in Glavina Donja, a village near the small Croatian town of Imotski, to ethnic Serbian parents Anđelija (1924–2018) and Dušan Ukraden (1927–1997).

She lived in Imotski with her grandparents until the age of two when she relocated to Višegrad, in eastern Bosnia and Herzegovina. When she was in elementary school, her family moved to Sarajevo where she lived until 1992 when the Bosnian War broke out.

When the war started, Neda moved to Belgrade, Serbia. Between 1992 and 1996, she rented an apartment in Vienna, Austria.

Respecting the wishes of her father, she attended the University of Sarajevo where she successfully completed degrees in Law, Philology, and the English language. It was only at age 17 that she started singing.

Ukraden was married to director Milan Bilbija and together they had a daughter named Jelena. Bilbija died on 30 January 2013 in Montenegro. Ukraden did not attend his funeral.

== Discography ==
Studio albums

- Srce u srcu (1975)
- Ko me to od nekud doziva (1976)
- Neda (1979)
- Čuje se glas (1981)
- To mora da je ljubav (1982)
- Oči tvoje govore (1984)
- Hoću tebe (1985)
- Šaj, šaj (1986)
- Došlo doba da se rastajemo (1987)
- Posluži nas srećo (1988)
- Ponoć je (1988)
- Dobro došli (1989)
- Poslije nas (1990)
- Nek živi muzika (1992)
- Jorgovan (1993)
- Između ljubavi i mržnje (1995)
- Ljubav žedna (1996)
- Nova Neda (2001)
- Život sam promjenila (2002)
- Ljubomora (2004)
- Za sva vremena (2004)
- Oduži mi se poljupcima (2006)
- Da se nađemo na pola puta (2009)
- Biti svoja (2012)
- Terapija (2016)
- Jednom kad ovo prođe (2021)
- Svoja na svom (2026)

Live albums

- Moj dilbere / Jubilarni koncert – Centar Sava 2017. (2017)
- Mojih prvih 50 – Live in Lisinski (2018)

Compilation albums

- Nedine najljepše pjesme (1977)
- Neda (1978)
- 10 hitova (1986)
- 20 hitova (1990)
- Za sva vremena (2004)
- Najveći hitovi (2008)
- The Best Of (2008)
- Radujte se prijatelji (2010)
- Najljepše ljubavne pjesme (2013)
- 50 originalnih pjesama (2016)
- Samo je nebo iznad nas – Dueti (2024)
- 25 Greatest Hits (2024)
- Zlatna kolekcija (2025)
