= Poljica =

Poljica may refer to:

- Republic of Poljica (Repubblica di Poglizza), an autonomous community near Omiš, Dalmatia which existed between the 13th and early 19th century
- Poljica, Podbablje, a village near Imotski, Croatia
- Poljica, Marina, a village near Marina, Croatia
- Poljica, Krk, a village on the island of Krk, Croatia
- Poljica, Jelsa, a village near Jelsa on the island of Hvar, Croatia
- Poljica, Zadar County, a village near Vrsi, Croatia
- Poljica, Danilovgrad, a village in the Danilovgrad municipality

== See also ==
- Poljice (disambiguation)
