= Sveti Ilija Tunnel =

Road tunnel in Croatia

- Location of Sveti Ilija Tunnel in Croatia
- Interactive map of Sveti Ilija Tunnel

Overview
- Coordinates: 43°22′N 16°59′E

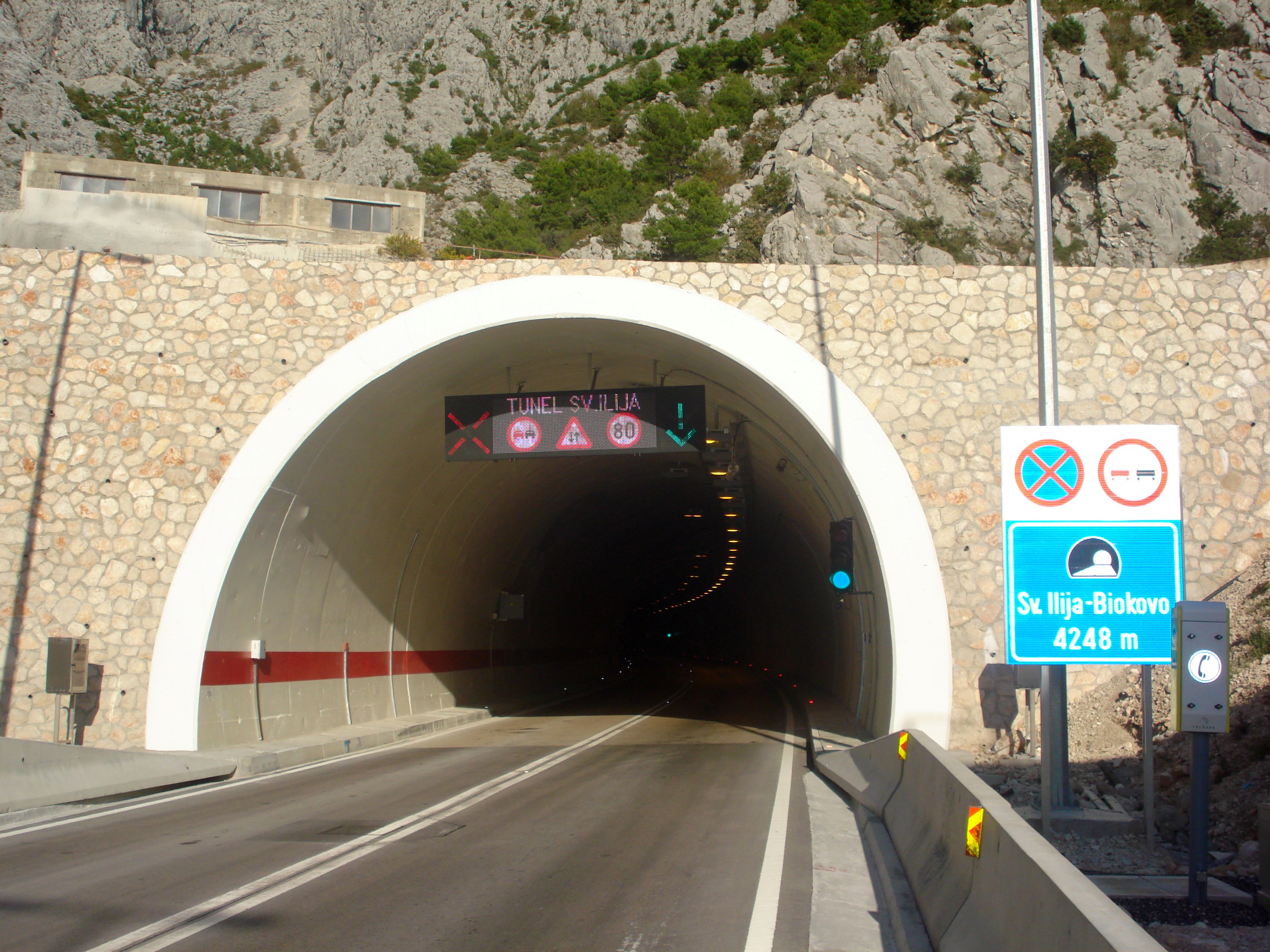
Sveti Ilija Tunnel - Southern Portal 002.jpg

The Sveti Ilija Tunnel (Croatian: Tunel Sveti Ilija; lit. 'Saint Elijah Tunnel') is a road tunnel through Biokovo mountain that connects the coastal and continental parts of the Split-Dalmatia County.

== Location and characteristics ==
The tunnel is 4,248 metres (13,937 ft) long, while the western, service tube is 4,255.62 metres (13,962.0 ft). Roadway is 7.7 m (25 ft) wide. Tunnel is carrying D76 state road. It passes through Biokovo between the Bast in the municipality of Baška Voda (south side) and Rastovac in the municipality of Zagvozd (north side).

It is named after the peak of the same name under which it is located. It is the fourth longest tunnel in Croatia, but first in Europe by overburden of 1,336.5 metres (4,385 ft) (height from tube to the ground) in Karst massif.

The construction of the tunnel started on March 25, 2008 from the north side. The tunnel was broken on January 21, 2010.Two companies participated in drilling: Hidroelektra niskogradnja from Zagreb, which were breaking the tunnel from the north side; and Konstruktor from Split, which were breaking the tunnel from the south side.

Not far from the tunnel in the area of Turija, during Napoleon's reign in 1809, a commemorative plaque was placed on the occasion of the completion of the construction of the road that stretched from Obrovac to Boka Kotorska, the so-called French Road. Two hundred years later, the tunnel was built as part of the modern road links between the Dalmatian hinterland and the coast.

The highest altitude of 1,635 metres (5,364 ft) is approximately halfway through the tunnel.

It was opened on July 8, 2013. From 2018, tunnel is not tolled.

Comparison with other tunnels:

- the highest overlay of the Sveti Rok tunnel is 580 m;
- the highest overlay of the Karawanks Tunnel tunnel is 1120 m.
