= Proložac =

Municipality in Split-Dalmatia County, Croatia

- Interactive map of Proložac
- Location within Croatia
- Coordinates: 43.469°N 17.152°E
- Country: Croatia
- Region: Dalmatian Hinterland
- County: Split-Dalmatia County

Area
  - Total: 54.7 km^{2} (21.1 sq mi)

Population (2021)
  - Total: 3,112
  - Density: 56.9/km^{2} (147/sq mi)
- Time zone: UTC+1 (CET)
  - Summer (DST): UTC+2 (CEST)
- Website: prolozac.hr

Proložac is a municipality in Split–Dalmatia County, Croatia.

It borders Herzegovina and some Croatian municipalities such as Imotski and Lovreć.

== Demographics ==
In 2021, the municipality had 3,112 residents in the following 5 settlements:

- Donji Proložac, population 1288
- Gornji Proložac, population 262
- Postranje, population 1079
- Ričice, population 179
- Šumet, population 304
Proložac: Population trends 1857–2021
v

| population | 3051 | 3246 | 3159 | 3598 | 3991 | 4756 | 5052 | 5610 | 6006 | 5749 | 6026 | 6497 | 5642 | 4801 | 4510 | 3802 | 3112 |
| | 1857 | 1869 | 1880 | 1890 | 1900 | 1910 | 1921 | 1931 | 1948 | 1953 | 1961 | 1971 | 1981 | 1991 | 2001 | 2011 | 2021 |

Sources: Croatian Bureau of Statistics publications
