= Biokovsko Selo =

- Village
- Location within Croatia
- Coordinates: 43°21′41″N 17°07′23″E
- Country: Croatia
- County: Split-Dalmatia
- Municipality: Zagvozd

Area
  - Total: 31.2 km^{2} (12.0 sq mi)

Population (2021)
  - Total: 41
  - Density: 1.3/km^{2} (3.4/sq mi)

Biokovsko Selo (Serbo-Croatian: [bǐkoʋskoː sělo]) is a village in the Split-Dalmatia County in Croatia, located within the municipality of Zagvozd. In 2021, it had a population of 41 people.

== Demographics ==
Historical population
Year	1857	1880	1890	1900	1910	1948	1953	1961	1971	1981	1991	2001	2011	2021
Pop.	235	258	325	392	454	777	770	748	671	323	164	99	55	41
±%	—	+9.8%	+26.0%	+20.6%	+15.8%	+71.1%	−0.9%	−2.9%	−10.3%	−51.9%	−49.2%	−39.6%	−44.4%	−25.5%
