= Prokupac =

Variety of grape

- Grape (Vitis)
- Color of berry skin: Noir
- Species: Vitis vinifera
- Also called: See list of synonyms
- Origin: Serbia
- VIVC number: 9734

Prokupac (Serbian Cyrillic: Прокупац) is a red Serbian wine grape that is used for producing high quality red wine, modern rosé types and less frequently a traditional darkly colored rosé. The grape can achieve high sugar levels prior to harvest and produce high levels of alcohol following fermentation. The wines produced from it are known for their freshness and dark fruit characteristics. As a traditional grape variety, Prokupac has in recent years become popular with wine enthusiasts, with its wines winning international awards including a number of gold Decanter medals.

Prokupac is mostly planted in the Three Moravas, Toplica, Šumadija and Leskovac wine regions, although in recent years it has also been planted in the northern Fruška Gora and eastern Negotinska Krajina regions.

The reasons why Prokupac is a widespread grape in Serbia include:

- It is entrenched in the Serbian terroir and has resistance to low and high temperatures
- It has relatively low maintenance demands
- It gives abundant harvests even on skeletal soil
- It has a high sugar content and many other character nuances which allow for seasonality and winemaking expertise to play a role in producing distinctive vintages

== Synonyms ==
Prokupac is also known under the synonyms Crnka, Darchin, Kamenicarka, Kamenilarka, Kamenitscharka, Majski Cornii, Negotinsko Crno, Nichevka, Nikodimka, Nisevka, Procoupatz, Procupac, Prokoupatz, Prokupats, Prokupatz, Prokupec, Prokupka, Rekavac, Rekovacka Crnka, Rskavac, Rskavats, Rskavaty, Scopsko Cherno, Skopsko Crno, Skopsko Tsrno, Tsrnina, Zachinok, Zaichin, Zarchin, Zarcin, Zartchin, Zartchine.

== Sources ==
- Popović, Miroslav (1968). Trstenik i njegova okolina: prilog ekonomsko-geografskom proucavanju komuna.
