= Ričice, Split-Dalmatia County =

Ričice
- Interactive map of Ričice
- Location within Croatia
- Coordinates: 43.50°N 17.13°E
- Country: Croatia
- County: Split-Dalmatia
- Municipality: Proložac

Area
  - Total: 14.9 km^{2} (5.8 sq mi)

Population (2021)
  - Total: 179
  - Density: 12.0/km^{2} (31.1/sq mi)
- Time zone: UTC+1 (CET)
  - Summer (DST): UTC+2 (CEST)

Ričice is a village in the municipality of Proložac, in inland Dalmatia, Croatia.

== History ==
On 25 March 2022 at 13:17 the ŽVOC Split received a call about a wildfire in the area. 50 hectares (120 acres) of pine forest burned by the time it was put out at 17:00 on the 27th, despite the intervention of a Canadair CL-415 and firefighting-equipped Mil Mi-8.

== Climate ==
Since records began in 1993, the highest temperature recorded at the local weather station at the barrier was 40.8 °C (105.4 °F), on 18 July 2007. The coldest temperature was −13.5 °C (7.7 °F), on 14 February 2012.

== Demographics ==
Village of Ričice: Population trends 1857–2021
v

population	1137	910	1056	1123	1177	1281	1334	1528	1671	1634	1681	1572	1077	734	547	231	179
	1857	1869	1880	1890	1900	1910	1921	1931	1948	1953	1961	1971	1981	1991	2001	2011	2021

Sources: Croatian Bureau of Statistics publications
