= Blue Lake (Croatia) =

Karst lake in southern Croatia

- Plavo Jezero (Croatian)
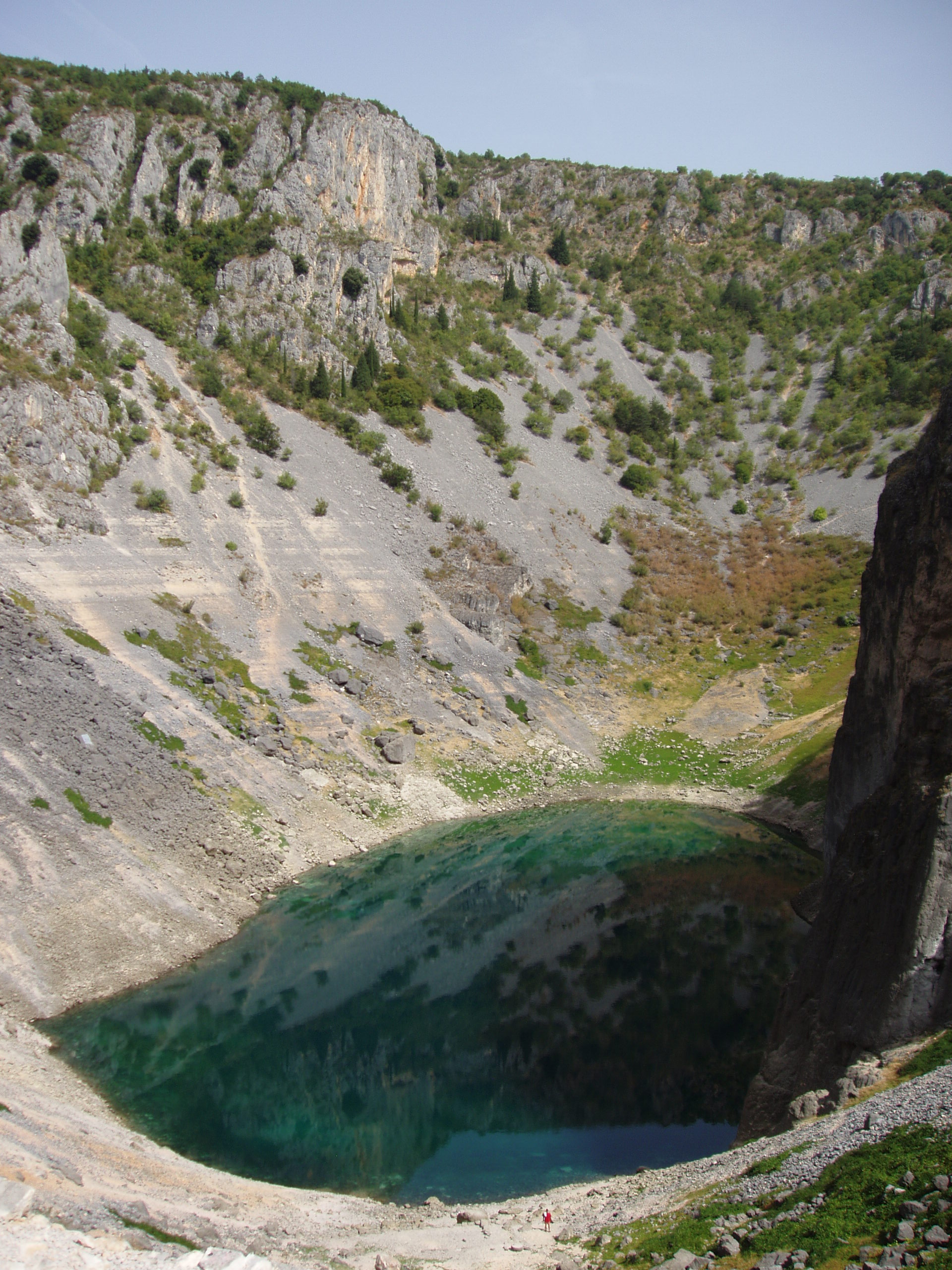

- Location within Croatia
- Coordinates: 43°27′1″N 17°12′38″E
- Basin countries: Croatia

Blue Lake (Croatian: Modro jezero or Plavo jezero) is a karst lake located near Imotski in southern Croatia. Like the nearby Red Lake, it lies in a deep sinkhole possibly formed by the collapse of an enormous cave. The total depth from the upper rim is around 220 metres (720 ft), while water depth varies with season. In spring, when the snow from surrounding mountains melts, it can reach 90 m (300 ft), and in 1914 it reached 114 m (374 ft), overflowing the southern rim. The lake is a popular destination for hiking and sight-seeing.

Maximum dimensions of the lake are around 800 m × 500 m (2,600 ft × 1,600 ft), but they significantly vary due to big changes in the water level. At the end of the summer the lake may completely disappear.

In 1907, a road was built descending to the lake. In 1942, an earthquake caused a large rockfall, resulting in reduction of the lake's depth.
