= Red Lake (Croatia) =

Sinkhole lake in Split-Dalmatia, Croatia

- Crveno Jezero (Croatian)
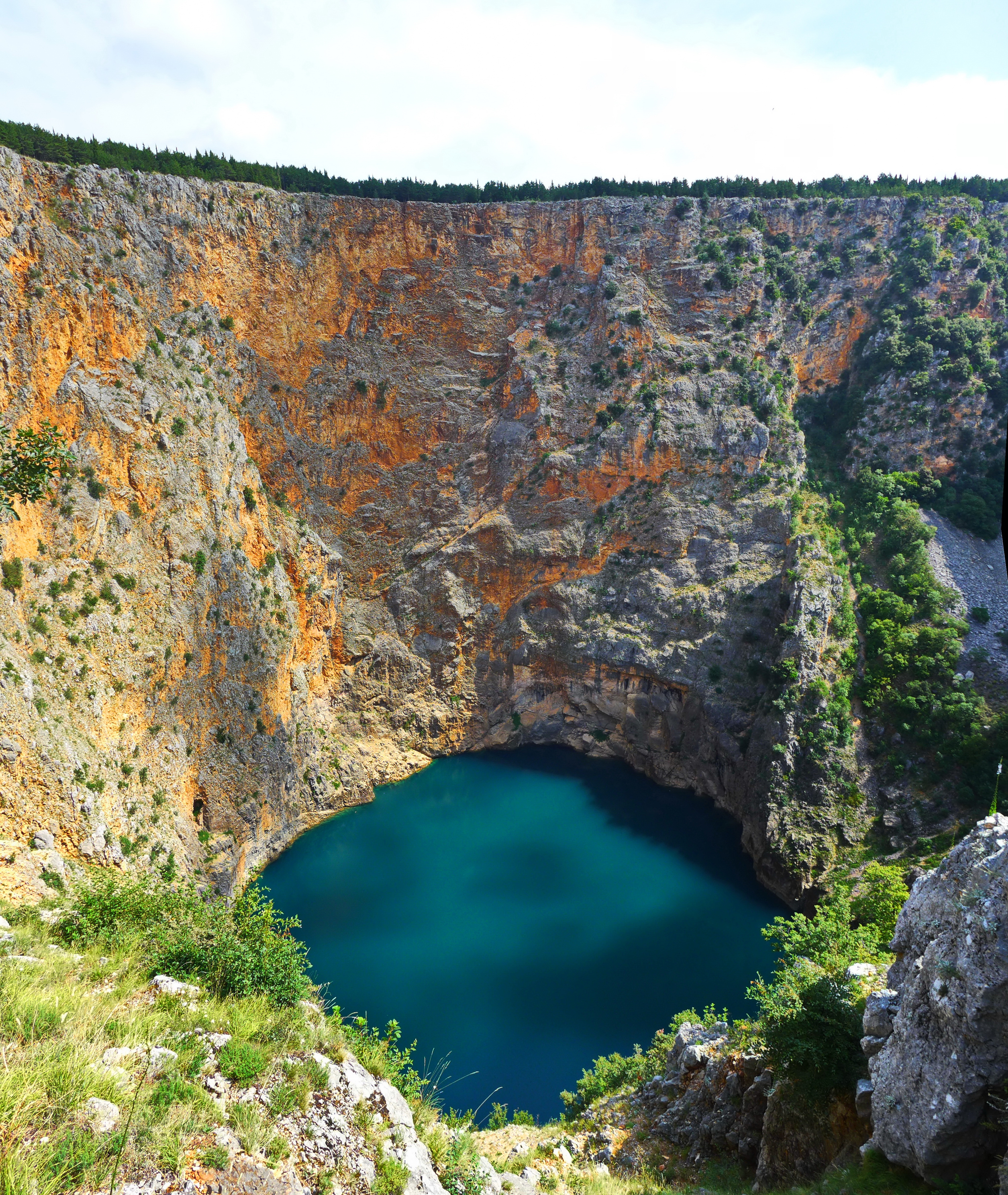

- Location within Croatia
- Interactive map of Red Lake
- Coordinates: 43°27′11″N 17°11′48″E
- Type: former cave
- Basin countries: Croatia
- Surface area: 2.7 hectares (6.7 acres)
- Average depth: 245 m (804 ft)
- Max. depth: 287 metres (942 ft)
- Surface elevation: 522 m (1,713 ft)
- Settlements: Imotski

Red Lake (Croatian: Crveno jezero) is a sinkhole containing a karst lake near the city of Imotski, Croatia. It is known for its numerous caves and high cliffs, reaching over 241 metres (791 ft) above normal water level and continuing below the water level. The total explored depth of this sinkhole is approximately 530 metres (1,740 ft) with a volume of roughly 25–30 million cubic metres, thus it is the third largest sinkhole in the world, and the deepest known case of a collapse doline containing a lake. Water drains out of the basin through underground waterways that descend below the level of the lake floor. The deepest known point of the lake is 4 metres (13 ft) below sea level.

The sinkhole is named after the reddish-brown colour of the surrounding cliffs, coloured by iron oxides.

Like the nearby Blue Lake, it is presumed that the lake emerged when the ceiling of a large cave hall collapsed.

The lake is inhabited with endemic and endangered spotted minnow (Delminichthys adspersus) and Imotski spined loach (Cobitis illyrica). In the dry period of the year, this fish can be occasionally seen in surrounding springs, rivers and lakes, suggesting that there is an underground connection between Red Lake and other water bodies.

At the 13th International Congress of Speleology in 2001, new findings were revealed. An inflow cave-shaped canal that measured approximately 30 × 30 metres was discovered in the eastern part of the lake at a depth of 175 metres (574 ft).

== History ==
It has been studied by Philipp Ballif, Artur Gavazzi, J. Daneš, Otto Oppitz, A. Ujević, and others.

== Gallery ==
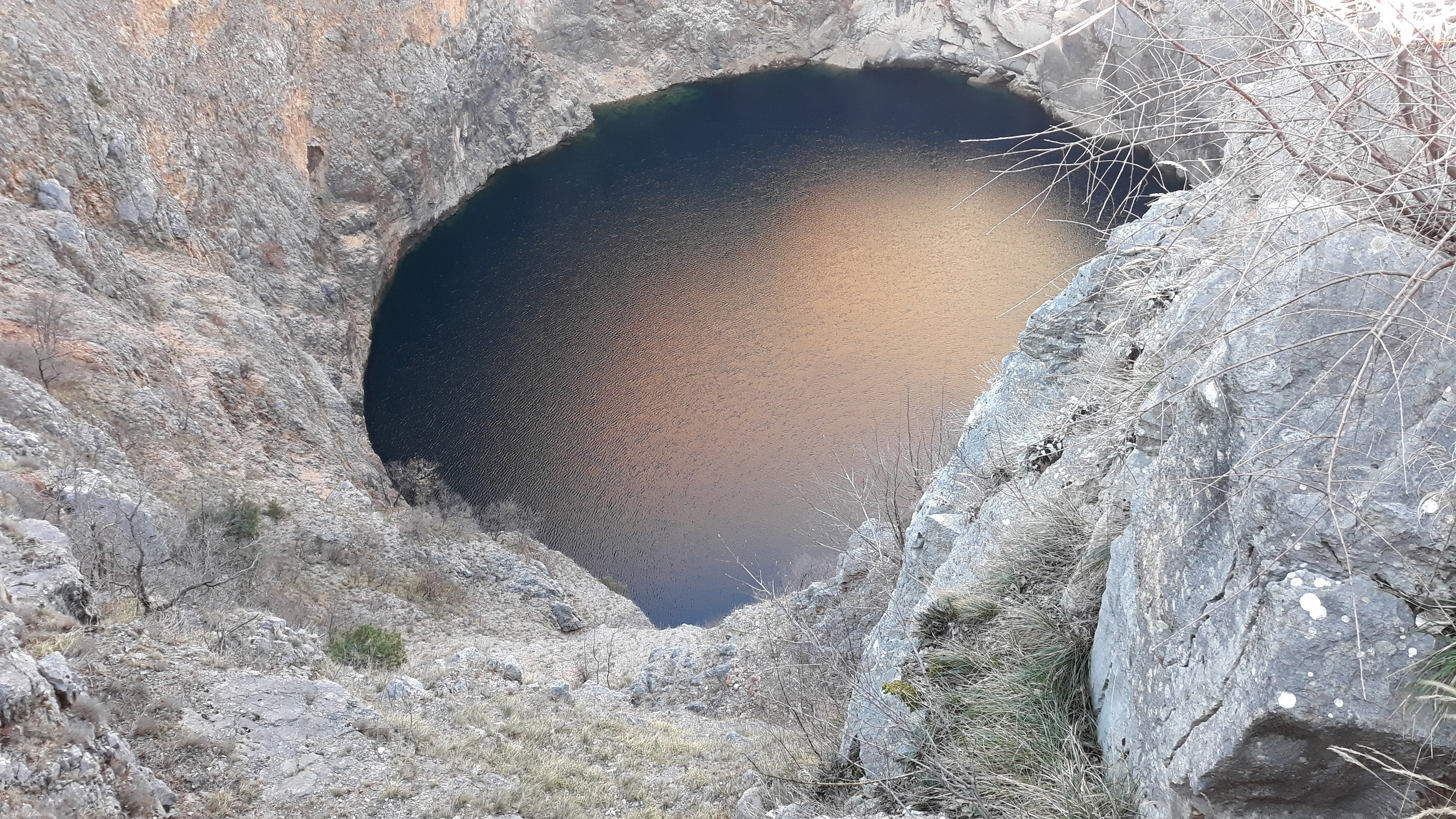
Red reflection

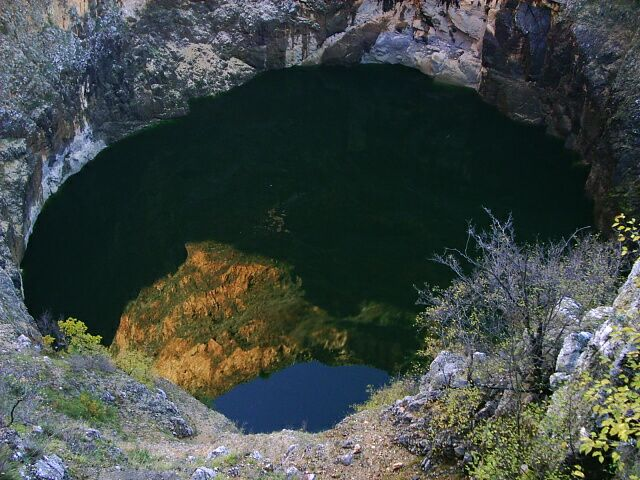
Clear reflection

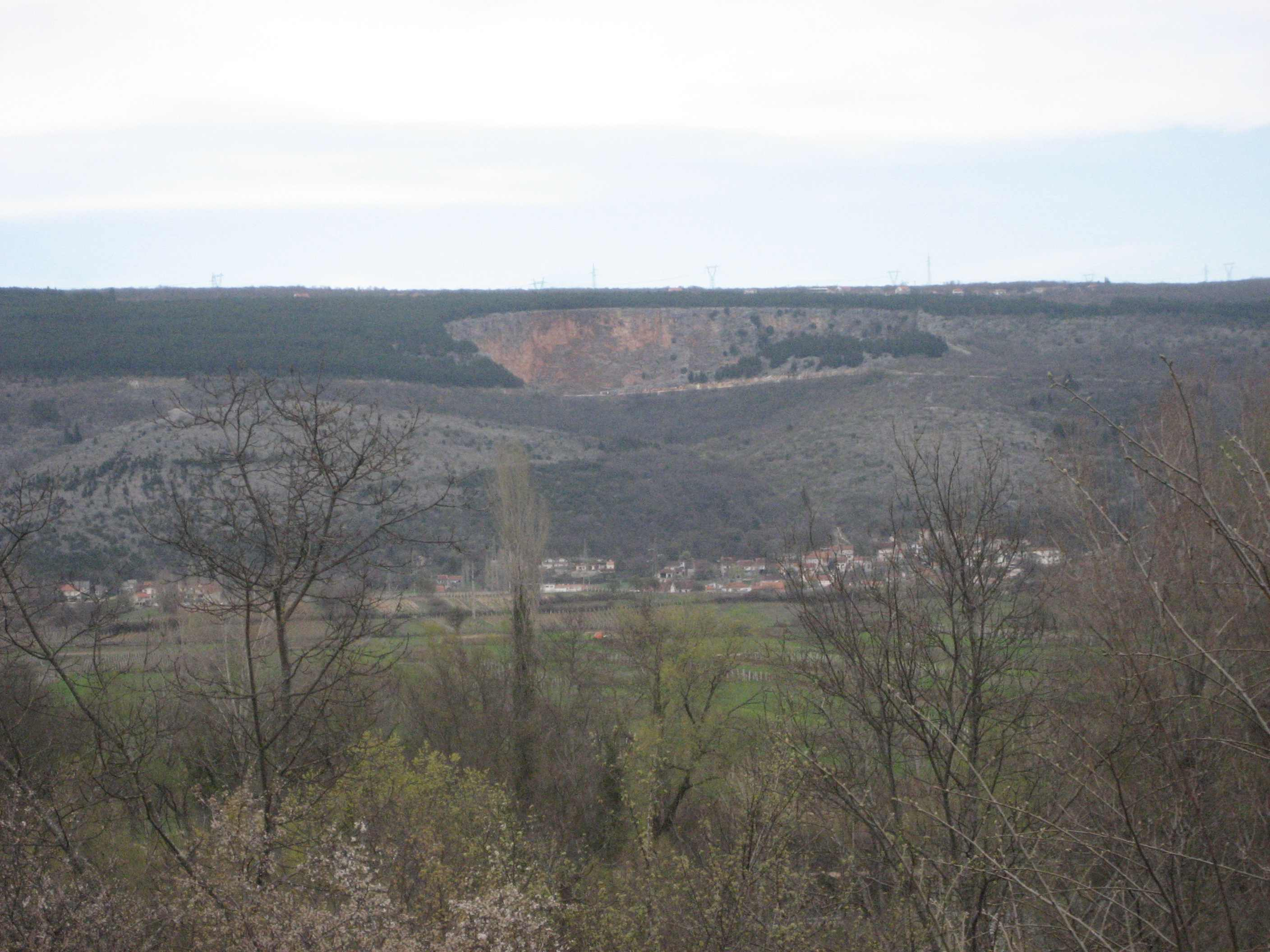
From the south

From the south

From the north

== See also ==
- List of deepest Dinaric caves
- List of Dinaric caves
- List of longest Dinaric caves

== Sources ==
- Ozimec, Roman; Jalžić, Branko; Jelić, Dušan (2017-12-01). "Preliminarni izvještaj prirodoslovnih istraživanja u okviru Speleoronilačke ekspedicije Crveno jezero 2017" [The Preliminary Report on Natural Sciences Research During the Cave Diving Expedition to the Red Lake 2017] (PDF). Subterranea Croatica (in Croatian). 15 (2): 34–41. eISSN 2623-6648.

== Literature ==
- Vrsalović, Adrijana; Andrić, Ivo; Bonacci, Ognjen (2021). "Identifikacija hidrogeološkoga režima Crvenoga jezera analizom glavne recesijske krivulje" [Identification of the Hydrological Regime of Red Lake by Master Recession Curve Analysis] (PDF). Zajednički temelji 2021 (in Croatian). doi:10.5592/CO/ZT.2021.19. ISBN 978-953-8168-52-9.
- Andrić, Ivo; Bonacci, Ognjen; Jukić, Branimir (2017-12-27). "Hydrological measurements in Crveno Jezero (Red Lake) in the period from 28 September 2013 to 10 September 2015". Hrvatske Vode. 25 (102): 253–258. ISSN 1849-0506.
- Kaufmann, Georg; Romanov, Douchko (2016-06-27). "Structure and evolution of collapse sinkholes: Combined interpretation from physico-chemical modelling and geophysical field work". Journal of Hydrology. 540: 688–698. Bibcode:2016JHyd..540..688K. doi:10.1016/j.jhydrol.2016.06.050. ISSN 0022-1694.
- Božić, Vlado (2013). "Crveno jezero - duboko je 432 m, a ne 528 m". Speleolog. 61 (published 2014-06-01): 94–97. eISSN 2623-7385.
- Andrić, Ivo; Bonacci, Ognjen; Jukić, Branimir (2013). "Rezultati najnovijih hidroloških i geomorfoloških istraživanja Crvenog jezera kod Imotskog". Hrvatske Vode. 21 (86): 344–348. ISSN 1849-0506.
- Garašić, Mladen (2012). "Crveno jezero - the biggest sinkhole in Dinaric Karst (Croatia)" (PDF). Geophysical Research Abstracts. 14. eISSN 1607-7962.
- Bonacci, Ognjen (2006). "Crveno i Modro jezero kod Imotskog". Hrvatske Vode. 54 (14): 45–54. ISSN 1330-1144.
- Kranjc, Andrej (2005). "Some large dolines in the Dinaric karst". Carsologica Sinica. 4 (1): 67–70. ISSN 1814-294X.
- Garašić, Mladen (2001). "New Speleohydrogeological Research of Crveno jezero (Red Lake) near Imotski in Dinaric Karst Area (Croatia, Europe) - International speleodiving expedition "Crveno jezero 98"" (PDF). 13th International Congress of Speleology, 4th Speleological Congress of Latin América and Caribbean, 26th Brazilian Congress of Speleology: Brasília DF, 15-22 de julho de 2001. pp. 555–559.
- Aspacher, B.; Haslinger, R.; Meyer, U.; Oertel, A. (2000). "Beyond the Blue". NSS News. Vol. 58, no. 5. Huntsville. pp. 141–149. ISSN 0146-9517.
- Garašić, Mladen (2000). "Speleohydrogeological Research of Crveno jezero (Red Lake) near Imotski in Dinaric Karst Area (Croatia)". Second Croatian Geological Congress, Cavtat-Dubrovnik: Proceedings. Zagreb. pp. 587–590.
- Aspacher, B.; Behrend, T. (1999). "Umbekannte Tiefe". Tauchen. Vol. 45, no. 5. pp. 81–85. ISSN 0170-4001.
- Kovačević, T. (1999). "Crveno jezero - Imotski". Hrvatska Vodoprivreda. 7 (78). Zagreb: 43–46. ISSN 1330-321X.
- Garašić, Mladen (1999). "Međunarodna speleološka ekspedicija u Crveno jezero kraj Imotskoga". Hrvatska Vodoprivreda. 7 (78). Zagreb: 40–42. ISSN 1330-321X.
- Bahun, Stjepan (1991). "O postanku Crvenog i Modrog jezera" (PDF). Geološki vjesnik. 44: 275–280. ISSN 0016-7924.
- Bojanić, Luka; Ivičić, Darko; Batić, Veljko (1981). "Hidrogeologija Imotskog polja s osvrtom na značaj u regionalnom smislu" (PDF). Geološki vjesnik. 34: 127–135. ISSN 0016-7924.
- Božičević, Srećko (1971). "Da li je Crveno jezero kod Imotskoga naša najdublja jama?". Priroda. Vol. 58, no. 6. p. 188. ISSN 0351-0662.
- Petrik, Milivoj (1965). Lakes in the Croatian limestone region.
- Petrik, Milivoj (1960). "Hidrografska mjerenja u okolici Imotskog". Ljetopis Jugoslavenske akademije znanosti i umjetnosti. 64: 266–286. ISSN 0373-9902.
- Roglić, Josip (1938). Имотско поље (физичко-географске особине). Посебна издања Географског друштва. Vol. 21. Belgrade.

=== Biology ===
- Papković, Dora; Alegro, Antun (2021-07-31). "Vascular flora of the geomorphological nature monument Crveno jezero (Dalmatia, Croatia)". Natura Croatica. 30 (1): 191–206. doi:10.20302/NC.2021.30.11. eISSN 1848-7386.
- Udovič, Marija Gligora; Žutinić, Petar; Kulaš, Antonija (2019-05-18). "A new benthic diatom species discovered and described from Crveno jezero (Imotski, Croatia)". Glasnik Hrvatskog botaničkog društva. 7 (1): 32–33. eISSN 1848-8102.
- Udovič, Marija Gligora; Žutinić, Petar; Kavre Piltaver, Ivna; Kulaš, Antonija; Ozimec, Roman; Tofilovska, Slavica (2018-06-06). "Gomphosphenia plenkoviciae sp. nov. A new species from Crveno jezero, Croatia". Phytotaxa. 351 (3): 229. Bibcode:2018Phytx.351..229U. doi:10.11646/phytotaxa.351.3.4. eISSN 1179-3163.
- Papković, Dora (2018-03-15) [defended 2018-02-22]. Flora Geomorfološkog spomenika prirode Crveno jezero (Thesis). Zagreb: Prirodoslovno-matematički fakultet Sveučilišta u Zagrebu.
- Cukrov, Marijana (2006-06-17). "Fauna Crvenog jezera". Subterranea Croatica. 4 (6): 2–27. ISSN 1334-5281.

=== Ecology ===
- Gudelj, Mihael (2022-11-11) [defended 2022-09-23]. Zaštita i geomorfologija krša Crvenog i Modrog jezera [Protection and karst geomorphology of the Red and Blue Lakes] (Thesis) (in Croatian). Zagreb: Fakultet šumarstva i drvne tehnologije Sveučilišta u Zagrebu.
- Brčić, Vlatko; et al. (2019). Geopark Imotska jezera. Zagreb: Hrvatski geološki institut. ISBN 978-953-6907-74-8.

=== Geology ===
- Marković, Tamara (2017). "Red and Blue Lakes (Crveno and Modro Jezero)". 44th Annual Congress of the IAH "Groundwater Heritage and Sustainability": Excursion Guidebook. Zagreb: Hrvatski geološki institut (published September 2017). ISBN 978-953-6907-68-7.

=== History ===
- Jonjić, Tomislav (2021). "Izmišljotine o tobožnjem bacanju imotskih Srba u Crveno jezero" [Fabrications on the Alleged Throwing of the Serbs from Imotski into the Red Lake] (PDF). Politički zatvorenik. No. 32. pp. 65–67. ISSN 1331-4688.
- Šarac, Damir (2021-10-18). "Imotski Hrvati ustali protiv ustaškog plana: Ne damo naše Srbe!". Slobodna Dalmacija. pp. 6–7. ISSN 0350-4662.
