= Gornji Vinjani =

Settlement in Split-Dalmatia County, Croatia

- Settlement
- Interactive map of Gornji Vinjani
- Location of Gornji Vinjani in Croatia
- Coordinates: 43°29′00″N 17°14′08″E
- Country: Croatia
- County: Split-Dalmatia
- City: Imotski

Area
  - Total: 17.4 km^{2} (6.7 sq mi)

Population (2021)
  - Total: 1,157
  - Density: 66.5/km^{2} (172/sq mi)
- Time zone: UTC+1 (CET)
  - Summer (DST): UTC+2 (CEST)
- Postal code: 21260 Imotski
- Area code: +385 (0)21

Gornji Vinjani is a settlement in the City of Imotski in Croatia. In 2021, its population was 1157.

== Demographics ==
Gornji Vinjani: Population trends 1857–2021
v

population			907	1026	1182	1347		1687	1647	1662	1658	1669	1467	1500	1417	1422	1157
	1857	1869	1880	1890	1900	1910	1921	1931	1948	1953	1961	1971	1981	1991	2001	2011	2021

Sources: Croatian Bureau of Statistics publications
