= Podbablje =

Municipality in Split-Dalmatia County, Croatia

- Interactive map of Podbablje
- Location within Croatia
- Coordinates: 43°25′00.84″N 17°10′33.96″E
- Country: Croatia
- Region: Dalmatian Hinterland
- County: Split-Dalmatia County

Area
  - Total: 44.8 km^{2} (17.3 sq mi)

Population (2021)
  - Total: 4,035
  - Density: 90.1/km^{2} (233/sq mi)
- Time zone: UTC+1 (CET)
  - Summer (DST): UTC+2 (CEST)
- Website: podbablje.hr

Podbablje is a municipality in Croatia in the Split-Dalmatia County.

== Demographics ==
In the 2011 census, it had a total population of 4,680, in the following settlements:

- Drum, population 702
- Grubine, population 1,010
- Hršćevani, population 392
- Ivanbegovina, population 268
- Kamenmost, population 520
- Krivodol, population 457
- Podbablje Gornje, population 523
- Poljica, population 808

In the same census, 96.28% were Croats.

Podbablje: Population trends 1857–2021
v

population	3277	3445	3366	3855	4795	5158	5470	5693	5693	6003	6127	6480	6060	5884	4904	4680	4035
	1857	1869	1880	1890	1900	1910	1921	1931	1948	1953	1961	1971	1981	1991	2001	2011	2021

Sources: Croatian Bureau of Statistics publications
