= Krstatice =

- Village
- Location within Croatia
- Coordinates: 43°22′48″N 17°08′17″E
- Country: Croatia
- County: Split-Dalmatia
- Municipality: Zagvozd

Area
  - Total: 14.8 km^{2} (5.7 sq mi)

Population (2021)
  - Total: 67
  - Density: 4.5/km^{2} (12/sq mi)

Krstatice is a village in the Split-Dalmatia County, Croatia located in the Zagvozd municipality. In 2011 it was populated by 123 inhabitants.
