= Dinka (grape) =

Variety of grape

- Grape (Vitis)
- Color of berry skin: Rose
- Species: Vitis vinifera
- Also called: Kövidinka and other synonyms
- Origin: Hungary
- VIVC number: 13727

Dinka or Kövidinka is a white Hungarian wine grape. There is also significant plantings near the Hungarian border in Slovenia, Croatia and Serbia.

== Synonyms ==
Dinka is also known under the synonyms Bakar, Chtein Chiler, Crvena Dinka, Crvena Ružica, Dinka Crvena, Dinka Mala, Dinka Rouge, Fleichstraube, Fleischtraube, Hajnalpiros, Kamena Dinka, Kamenoruziak Cerveny, Kamenoruzijak Cerveni, Kevidinka, Kövidinka, Kövidinka Rose, Kövidinka Rosovaia, Kövis Dinka, Kovidinka, Kovidinka Rose, Kovidinka Rozovaya, Kubinyi, Mala Dinka, Pankota, Pirca Voeroes, Piros Koevidinka, Raisin de Rose, Rosentraube, Roujitsa, Rusica, Ruzhitsa, Ružica, Ružica Crvena, Ruzike Cervena, Ruzsica, Ruzsitza, Schiller, Shtein Shiller, Sremska Ružica, Steinschiller, Steinschiller Rother, Steinschiller Roz, Vörös Dinka, Vorosz Dinka, Werschätzer, and Werschatzer.
