= Rastovac, Zagvozd =

Rastovac
- Village
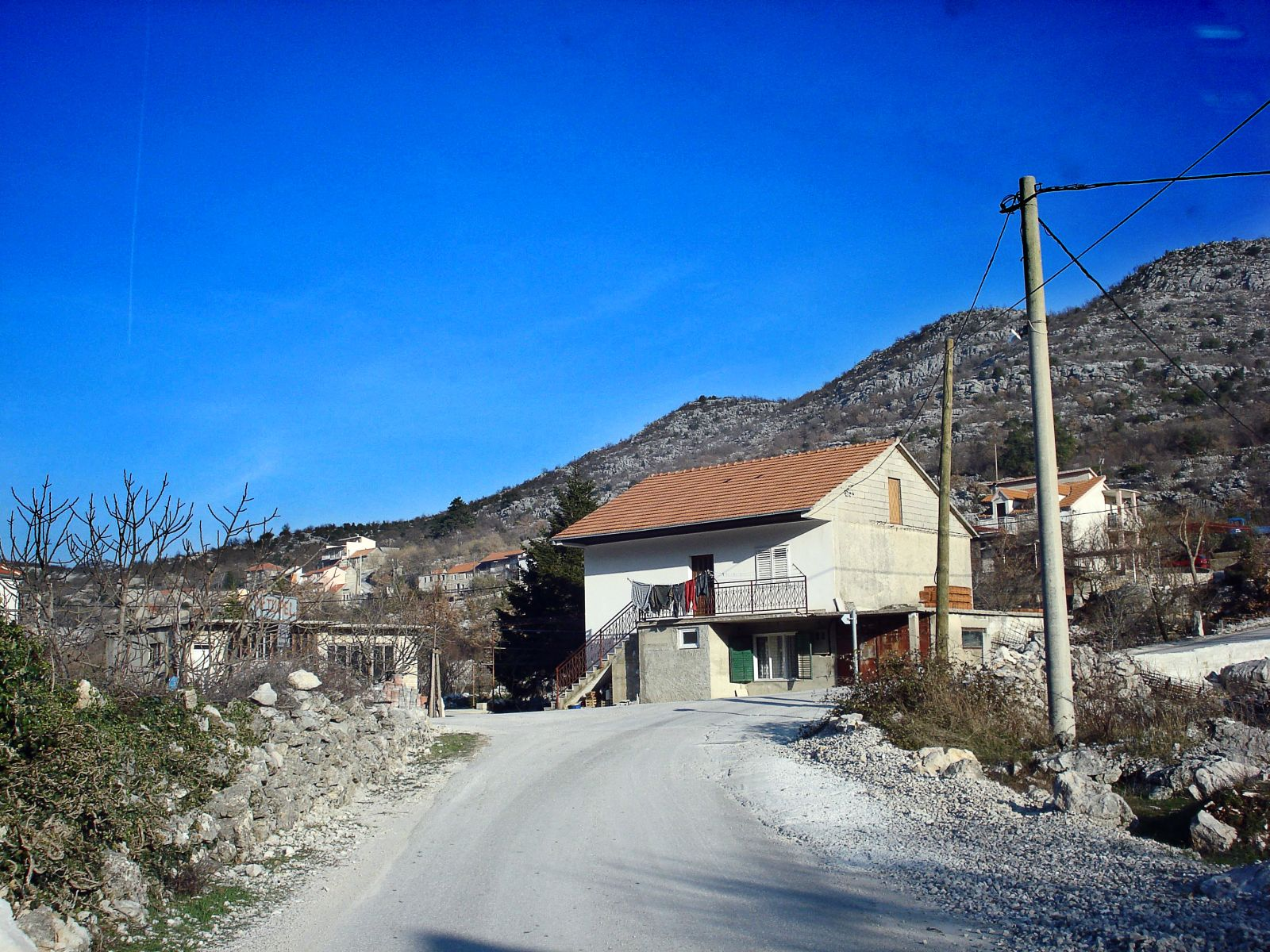

- Location within Croatia
- Coordinates: 43°23′48″N 17°01′16″E
- Country: Croatia
- County: Split-Dalmatia
- Municipality: Zagvozd

Area
  - Total: 16.2 km^{2} (6.3 sq mi)

Population (2021)
  - Total: 146
  - Density: 9.01/km^{2} (23.3/sq mi)

Rastovac is a village in the Split-Dalmatia County, Croatia located in the Zagvozd municipality. In 2011 it was populated by 168 inhabitants.
