= Bast, Croatia =

Bast
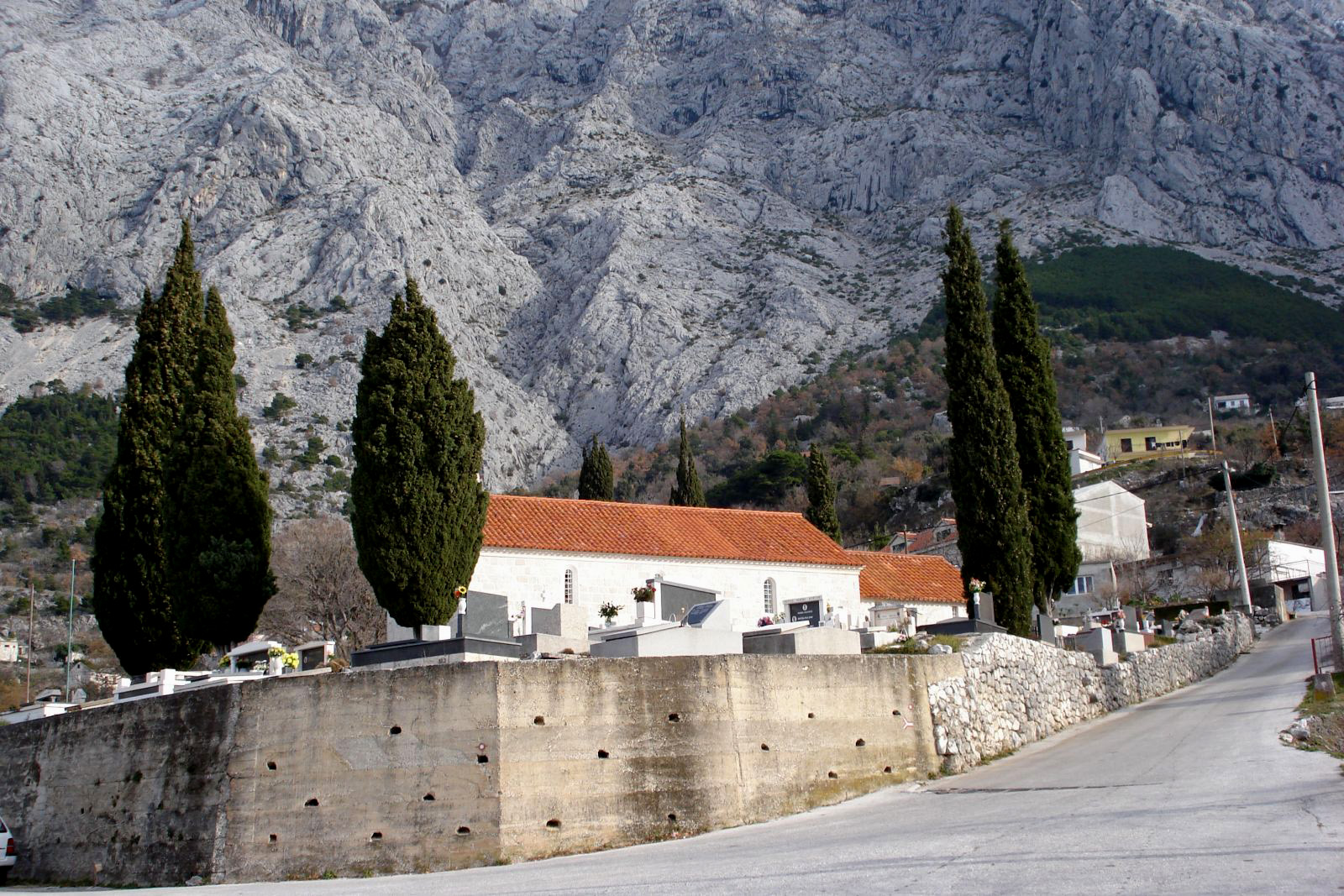

- Location in Croatia Bast (Croatia)
- Coordinates: 43°21′18″N 16°59′06″E
- Country: Croatia
- County: Split-Dalmatia County

Area
  - Total: 3.8 km^{2} (1.5 sq mi)
- Elevation: 310 m (1,020 ft)

Population (2021)
  - Total: 134
  - Density: 35/km^{2} (91/sq mi)
- Time zone: UTC+1 (CET)
  - Summer (DST): UTC+2 (CEST)

Bast is a village in the Baška Voda municipality in southern Croatia, located at the southern end of the Sveti Ilija Tunnel. In 2011, it had a population of 126. The village has declined in population since the 1950s, where it peaked at around 450 inhabitants. The traditional livelihood of the village was agriculture and the local quarry but since the turn of the 21st century there has been a shift to tourism, with the renting out of apartments and rooms driving the local economy.
