= Donji Proložac =

- Location within Croatia
- Coordinates: 43°28′N 17°09′E
- Country: Croatia
- County: Split-Dalmatia
- Municipality: Proložac

Area
  - Total: 7.2 km^{2} (2.8 sq mi)

Population (2021)
  - Total: 1,288
  - Density: 180/km^{2} (460/sq mi)
- Time zone: UTC+1 (CET)
  - Summer (DST): UTC+2 (CEST)

Donji Proložac is a village in the municipality of Proložac, in inland Dalmatia, Croatia. The population is 1,511 (census 2011).
