= Rašćane Gornje =

- Village
- Location within Croatia
- Coordinates: 43°20′15″N 17°10′04″E
- Country: Croatia
- County: Split-Dalmatia
- Municipality: Zagvozd

Area
  - Total: 9.0 km^{2} (3.5 sq mi)

Population (2021)
  - Total: 23
  - Density: 2.6/km^{2} (6.6/sq mi)

Rašćane Gornje is a village in the Split-Dalmatia County, Croatia located in the Zagvozd municipality. In 2011 it was populated by 19 inhabitants.
