= Župa Srednja =

- Village
- Location within Croatia
- Coordinates: 43°21′41″N 17°07′23″E
- Country: Croatia
- County: Split-Dalmatia
- Municipality: Zagvozd

Area
  - Total: 5.4 km^{2} (2.1 sq mi)

Population (2021)
  - Total: 3
  - Density: 0.56/km^{2} (1.4/sq mi)

Župa Srednja is a village in the Split-Dalmatia County, Croatia located in the Zagvozd municipality. In 2011 it was populated by 3 inhabitants.
