= Župa, Trebinje =

Župa Жупа
- Village
- Location within Bosnia and Herzegovina
- Coordinates: 42°42′24″N 18°30′57″E
- Country: Bosnia and Herzegovina
- Entity: Republika Srpska
- Municipality: Trebinje
- Time zone: UTC+1 (CET)
  - Summer (DST): UTC+2 (CEST)

Župa (Serbian Cyrillic: Жупа) is a village in the municipality of Trebinje, Republika Srpska, Bosnia and Herzegovina.

== History ==
In 1390, a Kobilić is mentioned as the knez (duke) of "Župa".
