= Tamjanika =

Variety of grape

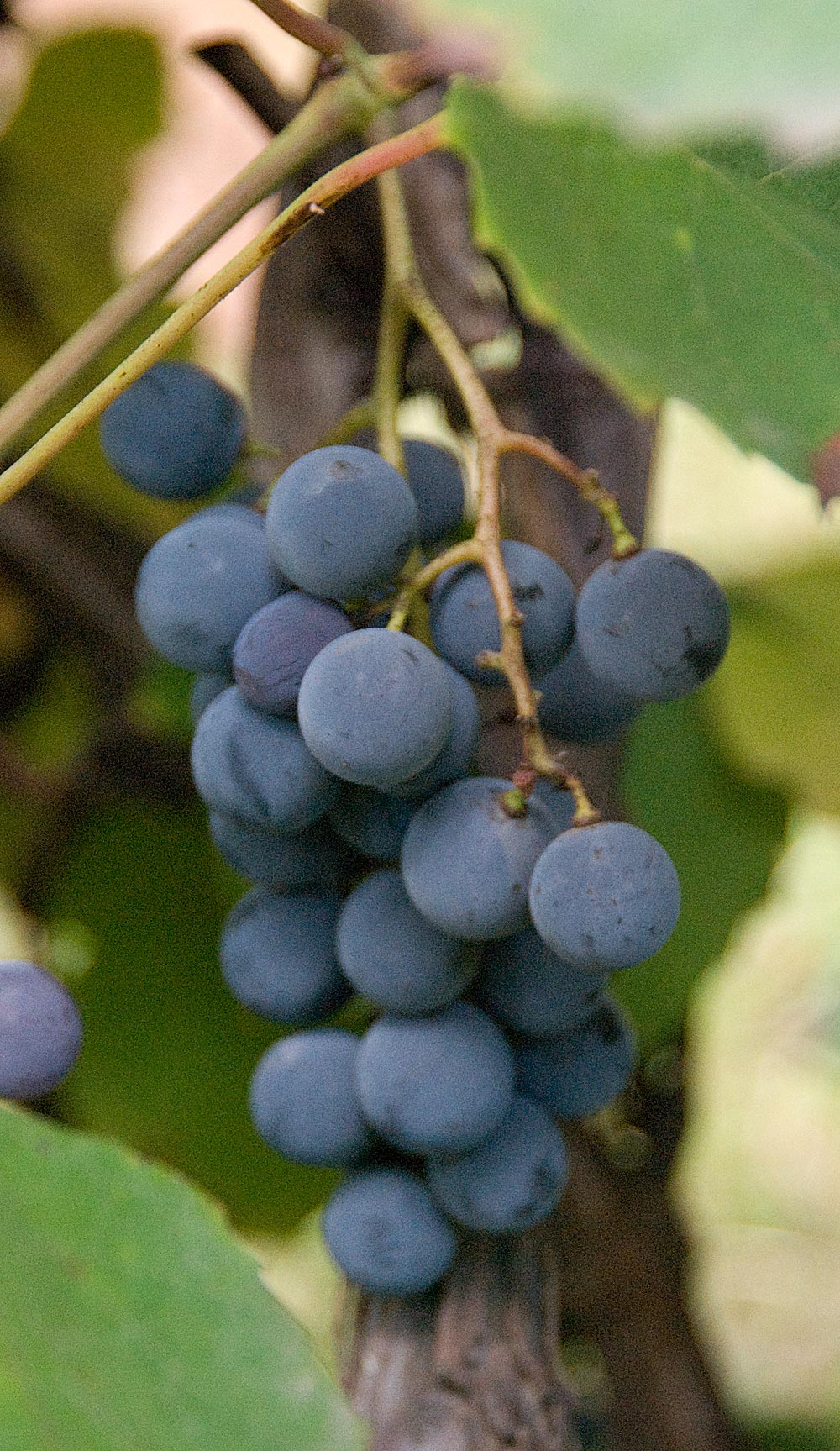
berry cluster

Tamjanika, Temjanika or Tamyanka (Serbian: тамјаника, Macedonian: темјаника, Bulgarian: тамянка) is a grape variety from the muscat family (likely all descendant from Muscat Blanc à Petits Grains), grown in Serbia, North Macedonia and Bulgaria. It is named after tamjan ("frankincense"), due to the intense scent from the ripe grapes, which can be detected several metres away. The berries are small, very dark purple, almost perfect spheres. They ripen in mid September.

White Tamjanika (Serbian: тамјаника бела, romanized: Tamjanika bela) is used to produce white wines with an intensely fruity aroma and taste. It has the characteristic Muscat notes of cinnamon, elder plant, basil, pineapple and strawberry. Red Tamjanika (Serbian: тамјаника црна, romanized: Tamjanika Crna), is a rarity, but of exceptional quality.

In Serbia, White Tamjanika is the 16th most commercially planted grape variety. It is particularly found in the Three Moravas (61%), and Srem (19,45%) wine regions.
