= Donji Vinjani =

Village in southern Croatia

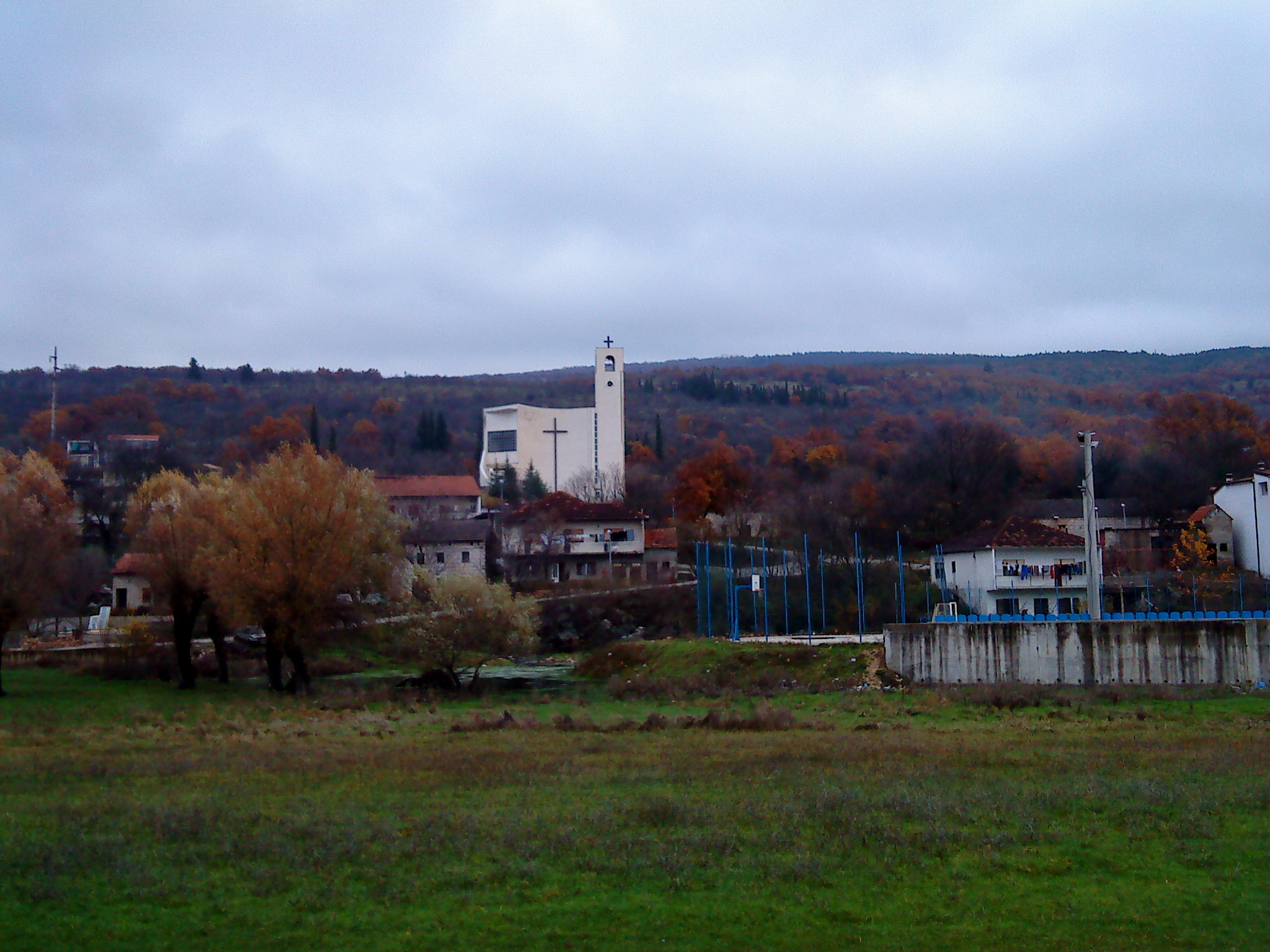
- Church of St. Nikola Tavelić in Vinjani Donji
- Interactive map of Donji Vinjani
- Location within Croatia
- Coordinates: 43°26′48″N 17°14′25″E
- Country: Croatia
- County: Split-Dalmatia
- City: Imotski

Area
  - Total: 17.4 km^{2} (6.7 sq mi)

Population (2021)
  - Total: 1,735
  - Density: 99.7/km^{2} (258/sq mi)
- Time zone: UTC+1 (CET)
  - Summer (DST): UTC+2 (CEST)

Donji Vinjani or Vinjani Donji is a village near Imotski, Croatia; population 2,169 (census 2011).

== History ==
From 19 to 26 March 2022, a forest fire consumed 106 hectares (260 acres) of pine and oak forest near Donji Vinjani.

== Notable people ==
- Ivan Bušić Roša (1745–1783), hajduk commander
- Ferdo Bušić, historian
- Bruno Bušić (1939–1978), writer and dissident
- Ante Rebić (born 1993), professional football player
