= Poljice, Maglaj =

Village in Maglaj, Bosnia and Herzegovina

Poljice Пољице
- Village
- Location within Bosnia and Herzegovina
- Coordinates: 44°34′31″N 18°05′47″E
- Country: Bosnia and Herzegovina
- Entity: Federation of Bosnia and Herzegovina
- Canton: Zenica-Doboj
- Municipality: Maglaj

Area
  - Total: 0.25 sq mi (0.65 km^{2})

Population (2013)
  - Total: 138
  - Density: 550/sq mi (210/km^{2})
- Time zone: UTC+1 (CET)
  - Summer (DST): UTC+2 (CEST)

Poljice is a village in the municipality of Maglaj, Bosnia and Herzegovina.

== Demographics ==
According to the 2013 census, its population was 138.

Ethnicity in 2013
Ethnicity	Number	Percentage
Bosniaks	92	66.7%
Serbs	45	32.6%
other/undeclared	1	0.7%
Total	138	100%
