= Ivanbegovina =

- Village
- Location in Croatia
- Coordinates: 43°24′50″N 17°07′44″E
- Country: Croatia
- County: Split-Dalmatia County

Area
  - Total: 1.1 km^{2} (0.42 sq mi)

Population (2021)
  - Total: 251
  - Density: 230/km^{2} (590/sq mi)
- Time zone: UTC+1 (CET)
  - Summer (DST): UTC+2 (CEST)
- Postal code: 21262
- Area code: +385 21
- Vehicle registration: IM

Ivanbegovina is a village in the Split-Dalmatia County, in Croatia. It is part of Podbablje municipality.
