= Imotski =

Town in Split-Dalmatia, Croatia

- Town
- Grad Imotski; Town of Imotski
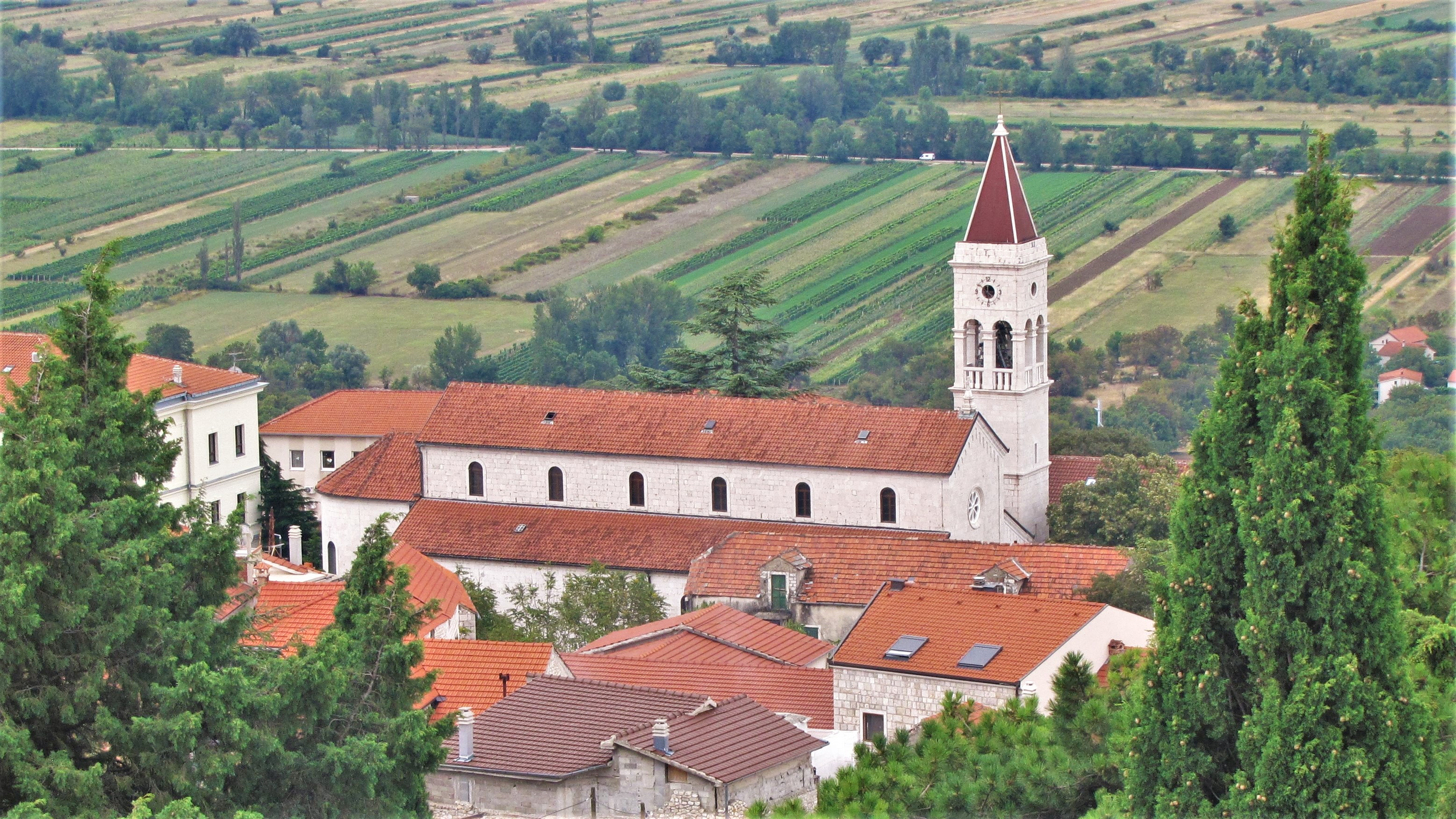
- Franciscan Monastery and Church of St. Francis of Assisi in Imotski

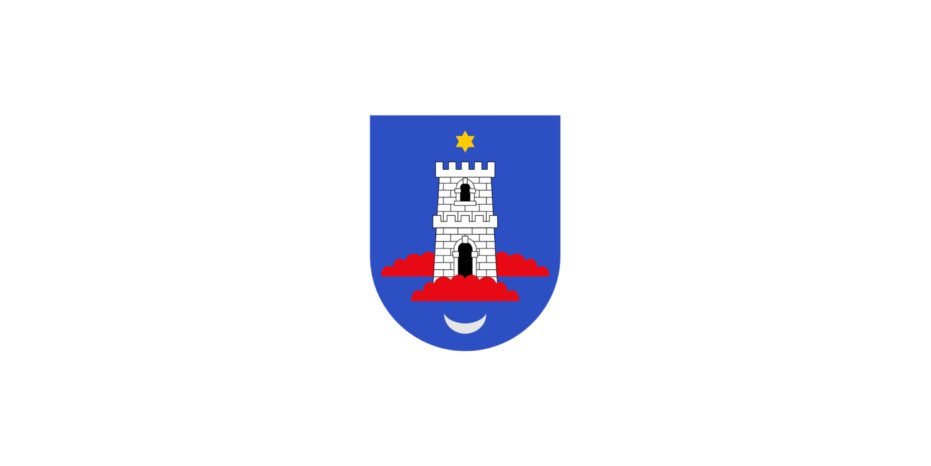
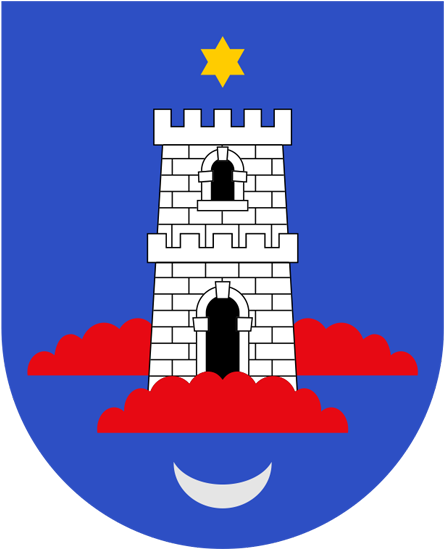
- Flag Seal
- Nickname: Grad na gori (Town on the hill)
- Interactive map of Imotski
- Location of Imotski in Croatia
- Coordinates: 43°27′N 17°13′E
- Country: Croatia
- Region: Dalmatian Hinterland
- County: Split-Dalmatia County

Government
  - Mayor: Luka Kolovrat (HDZ)

Area
  - Town: 58.7 km^{2} (22.7 sq mi)
  - Urban: 11.4 km^{2} (4.4 sq mi)
- Elevation: 395 m (1,296 ft)

Population (2021)
  - Town: 9,153
  - Density: 156/km^{2} (404/sq mi)
  - Urban: 4,008
  - Urban density: 352/km^{2} (911/sq mi)
- Time zone: UTC+1 (CET)
  - Summer (DST): UTC+2 (CEST)
- Postal code: 21260
- Area code: 021
- Vehicle registration: IM
- Website: imotski.hr

Imotski (pronounced [ǐmɔtskiː]) is a small town on the northeastern side of the Biokovo massif in the Dalmatian Hinterland of southern Croatia, near the border with Bosnia and Herzegovina. The town has a generally mild Mediterranean climate which makes it a popular tourist destination.

== Geography ==
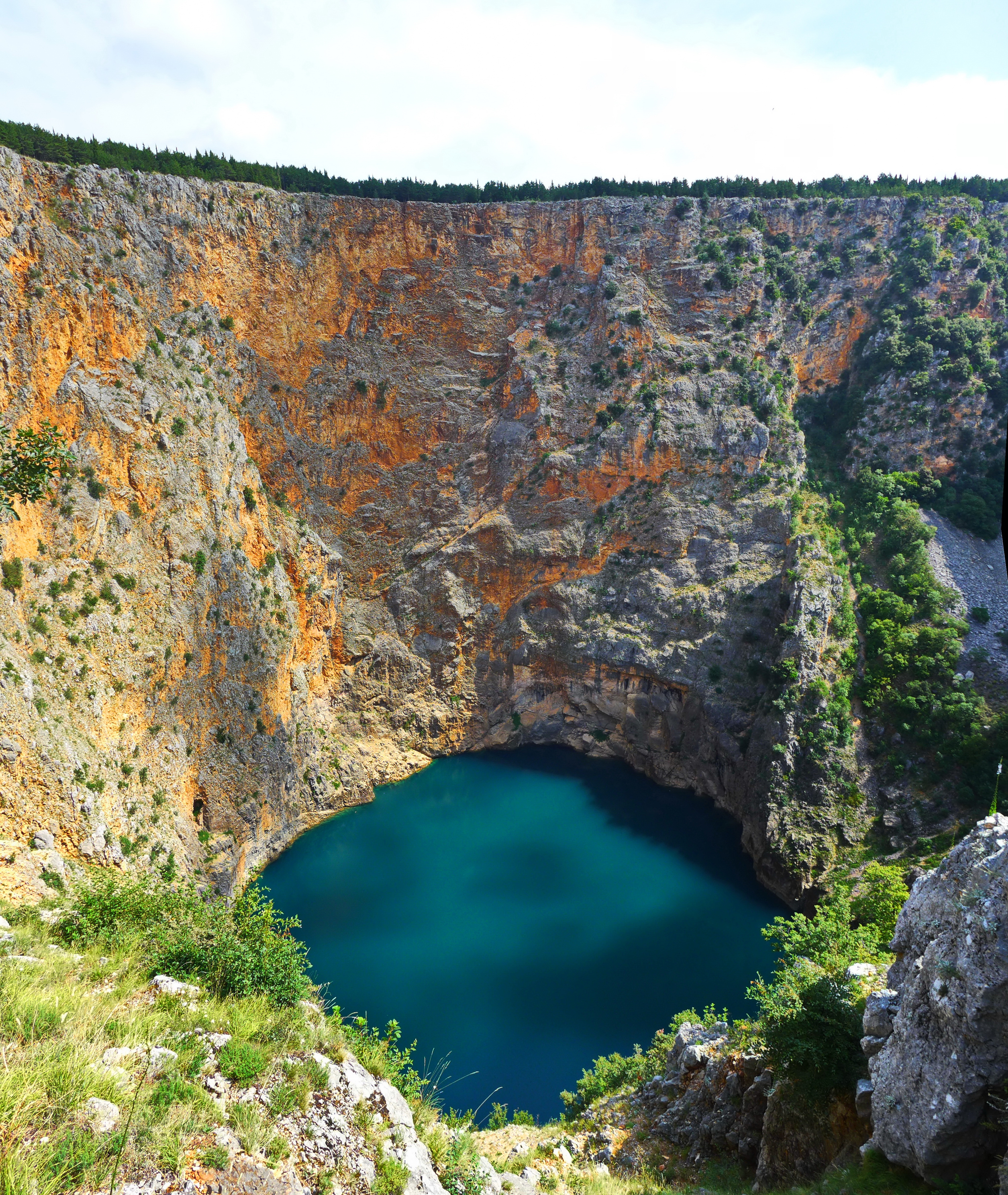
Red Lake

The town is located close to the border with Bosnia and Herzegovina, 10 km away from Posušje and 18 km from Grude. It is located 29 km away from the coast of Adriatic Sea (Baška Voda). The nearest coastal town is Makarska, on the other side of the Biokovo massif.

The town is located on the crossroad of D60 and D76 state roads and 20 km from the Sveti Ilija Tunnel. The A1 motorway is accessed at the Zagvozd Interchange, next to the D76 expressway.

Imotski is known for its medieval fortress on the rocks of Blue Lake. Another phenomenon is the Red Lake which looks like an eye in the scenery. Both lakes are said to be connected with underground channels to the Adriatic Sea.

== History ==
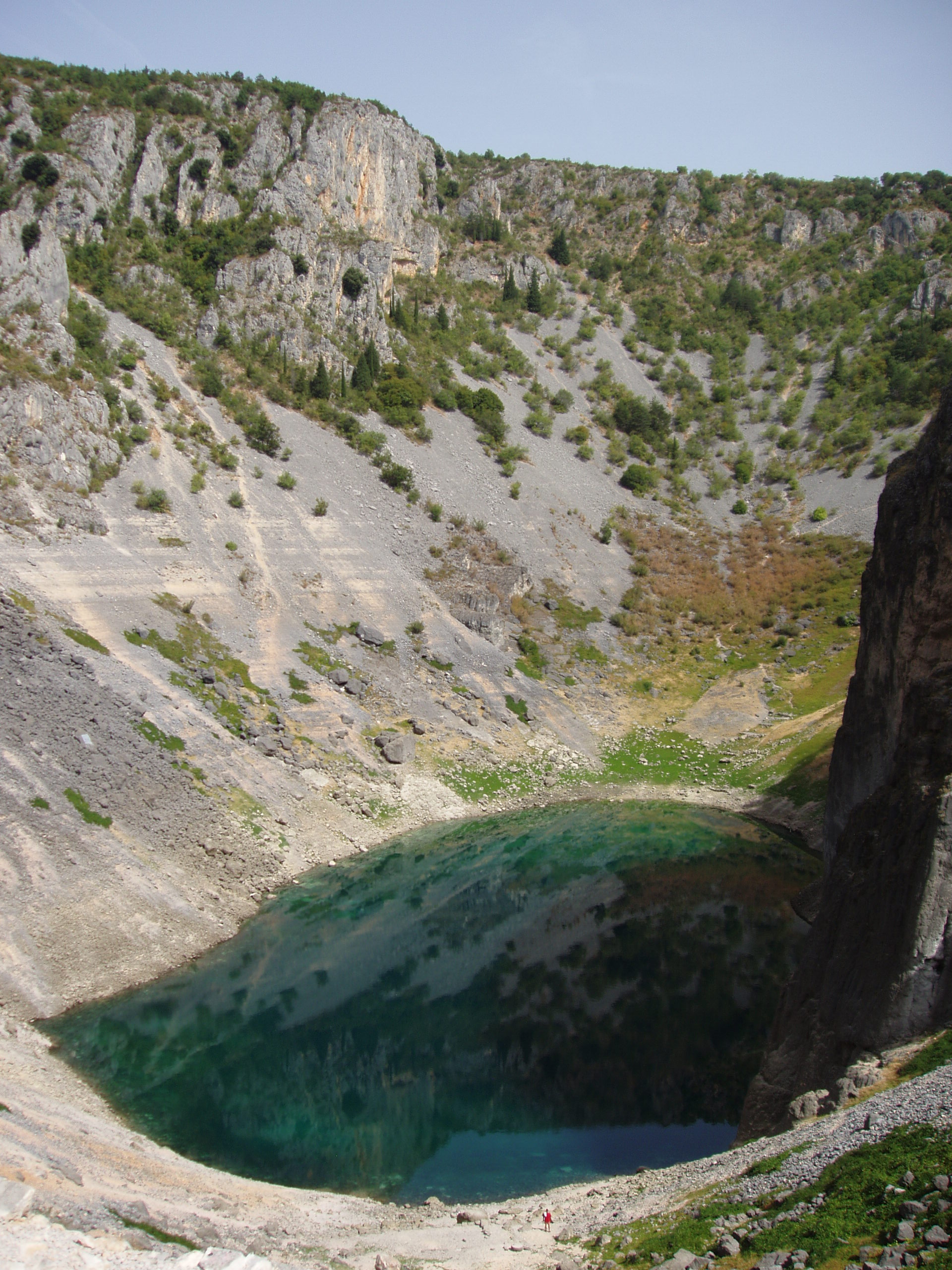
Blue Lake

The region around Imotski has been populated in the Neolithic age. At the time of Illyrians and Romans it was known as "Emotha" and later "Imota". It was first mentioned by today's name by Byzantine Emperor Constantine VII Porphyrogenitus in the 10th century. In medieval historical sources it was mentioned as an important fortress. The fortress above the town, Topana, was first mentioned in the 9th century, in the times of Croatian sovereigns.

Imotski was in Kingdom of Croatia, held by the Ottomans from the fall of Bosnia in 1492 until 1717 when it was captured by the Venetians. In April 1717, a small church, dedicated to the Lady of Angels, was built in honour of the victory against the Ottomans. The Lady of Angels has since then been honored as patroness of Imotski and the Imotski region.

The Hasanaginica folk ballad was created in the Imotski region in mid 17th century.

After that Imotski was in the Illyrian Provinces, Kingdom of Dalmatia, Kingdom of Yugoslavia, Independent State of Croatia and SFR Yugoslavia. Today it is part of Republic of Croatia.

In 1912, a secondary school was built in Imotski when the town was part of the Kingdom of Dalmatia within the Austro-Hungarian Empire.

From 1941 to 1945, Imotski was part of the Independent State of Croatia. In April 1944, German forces shot down three American B-24s. The local population saved many of the American personnel despite being bombed by them. One airman/paratrooper, Marion Dropulich, who crashed near Imotski but survived and was taken by Italian soldiers, happened to have been a Croatian American with immediate Imotski ancestry.

== Climate ==
The climate is modified Mediterranean, with the highest air temperature averaging 26 °C (79 °F) during July and the lowest averaging 5 °C (41 °F), in January. Summers are usually very hot during the day, temperature goes up to 40 °C. Temperatures above 10 °C (50 °F) last for more than 250 days a year.

Since records began in 1981, the highest temperature recorded at the local weather station was 40.7 °C (105.3 °F), on 10 August 2017. The coldest temperature was −12.1 °C (10.2 °F), on 7 January 2017.

Two kinds of wind are common in the area - the northern to north-eastern bora, which usually brings cold and clear weather in winter, and the southern to south-eastern sirocco, which often brings rain.

== Population ==
According to the 2011 census, the town proper has a population of 4,757, while the whole municipality has a population of 10,764. The absolute majority are Croats with 96.78% of the population.

The Town of Imotski administratively consists of the following settlements:

- Donji Vinjani - 2,169
- Glavina Donja - 1,748
- Glavina Gornja - 283
- Gornji Vinjani - 1,422
- Imotski - 4,757
- Medvidovića Draga - 385
Town of Imotski: Population trends 1857–2021
v

| population | 3127 | 3538 | 3704 | 4307 | 4827 | 5410 | 5693 | 5911 | 6879 | 7147 | 7362 | 8084 | 8911 | 9935 | 10213 | 10764 | 9153 |
| | 1857 | 1869 | 1880 | 1890 | 1900 | 1910 | 1921 | 1931 | 1948 | 1953 | 1961 | 1971 | 1981 | 1991 | 2001 | 2011 | 2021 |

Sources: Croatian Bureau of Statistics publications

== Notable people ==
Žarko Domljan, the first Speaker of the Croatian Parliament, was born in Imotski. The famous poet Tin Ujević spent part of his childhood in Imotski. Politician, poet and Croatian dissident Vlado Gotovac was born and spent his early years in Imotski. The town itself is home to the Croatian league football club NK Imotski.

There are other individuals born in Imotski to have made their names known outside of the local region. Notably, Dr Petar Vuković, renowned physician and literary critic, was born and raised, and still lives in Imotski. In the world of entertainment, there is the singer Neda Ukraden and film director Antun Vrdoljak. Sports stars include female tennis player Silvija Talaja and footballers Zvonimir Boban, Tomislav Bušić, Ivan Gudelj, Ante Rebić and Ante Šuto. The father of former Canada national men's ice hockey team captain Joe Sakic, Marijan Šakić, is from Imotski. The famous boxer Mate Parlov was born near Imotski in the village of Ričice. Zvonko Bušić, a Croatian emigrant notorious for the TWA Flight 355 hijacking, was also from Imotski as well as famous dissident Bruno Bušić. Dinko Šakić, a fascist leader in the Nazi puppet state Independent State of Croatia, was born in Imotski, and Veljko Kadijević, Minister of Defence in the Yugoslav government from 1988 to 1992, was born in Glavina Donja, near Imotski, but then moved to Moscow, Russia.

== Twin towns ==
Imotski is twinned with:

- Bjelovar, Croatia
