= Župa, Split-Dalmatia County =

Župa
- Village
- Location within Croatia
- Coordinates: 43°21′41″N 17°07′23″E
- Country: Croatia
- County: Split-Dalmatia
- Municipality: Zagvozd

Area
  - Total: 17.0 km^{2} (6.6 sq mi)

Population (2021)
  - Total: 37
  - Density: 2.2/km^{2} (5.6/sq mi)

Župa is a village in the Split-Dalmatia County, Croatia located in the Zagvozd municipality. In 2011 it was populated by 53 inhabitants.
