= Poljica, Podbablje =

Coordinates: 43°25′12″N 17°06′55″E

- Interactive map of Poljica, Podbablje

Poljica is a village in the municipality of Podbablje, Croatia. In the 2011 census, it had 808 inhabitants.
