= Župa (Tutin) =

Coordinates: 42°58′55″N 20°21′43″E

- Village (Selo)
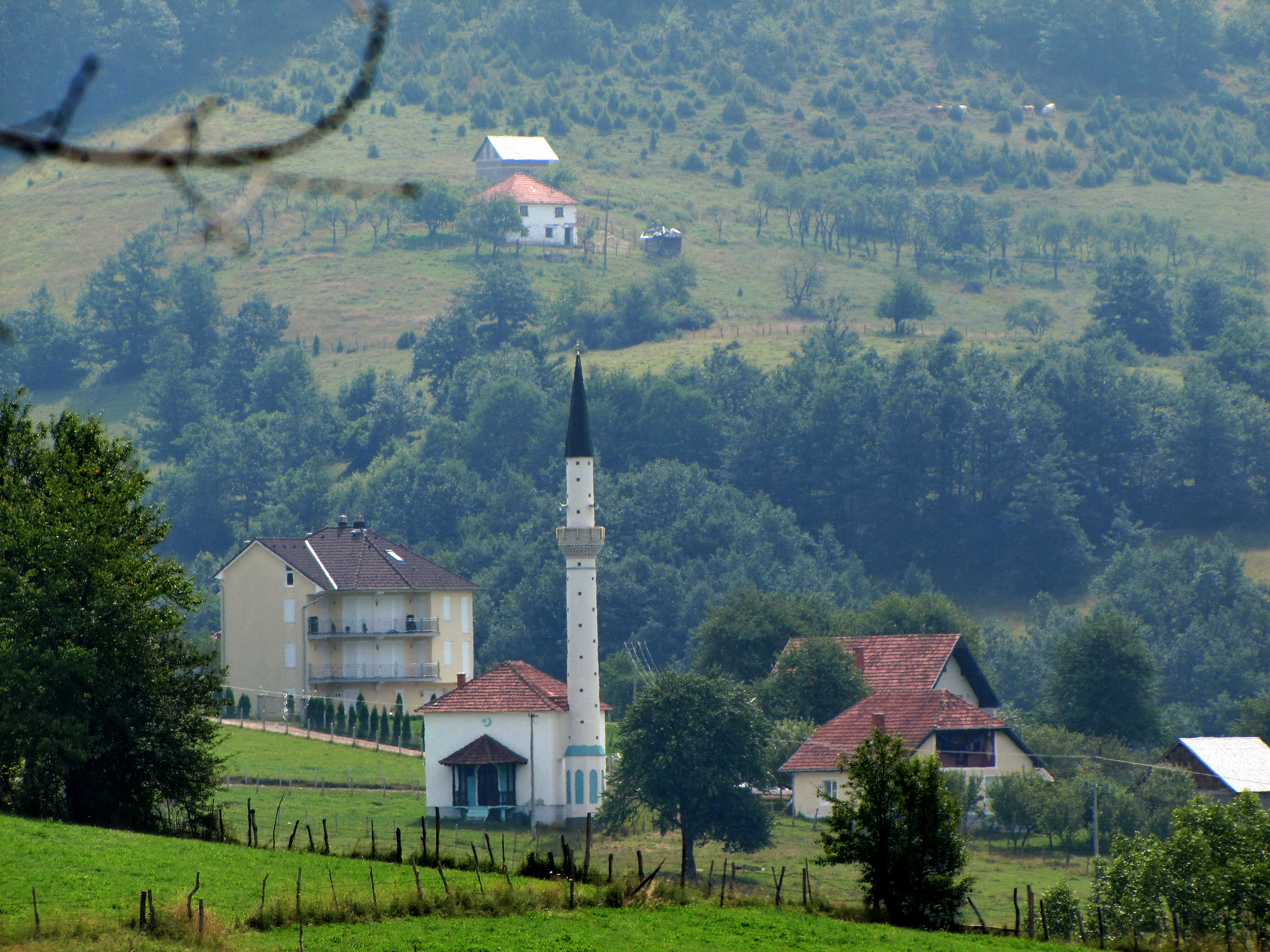
- Interactive map of Župa
- Country: Serbia
- District: Raška District
- Municipality: Tutin

Population (2002)
  - Total: 344
- Time zone: UTC+1 (CET)
  - Summer (DST): UTC+2 (CEST)

Župa is a village in the municipality of Tutin, Serbia. According to the 2002 census, the village has a population of 344 people.
