= Zagvozd =

Town and municipality in Split-Dalmatia County, Croatia

- Village and municipality
- Općina Zagvozd; Municipality of Zagvozd
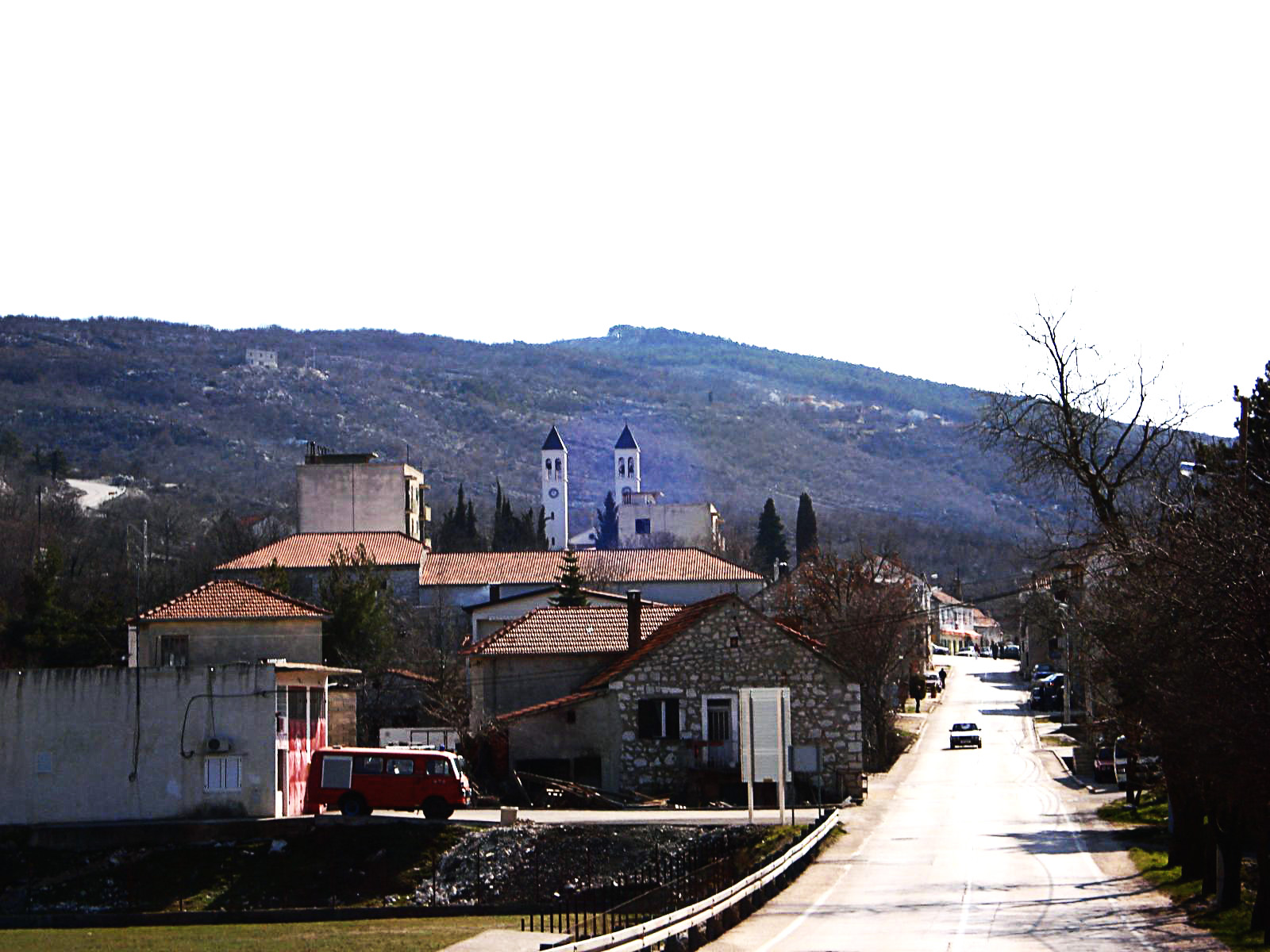
- Zagvozd in 2009, view from the Franjo Tuđman Street.

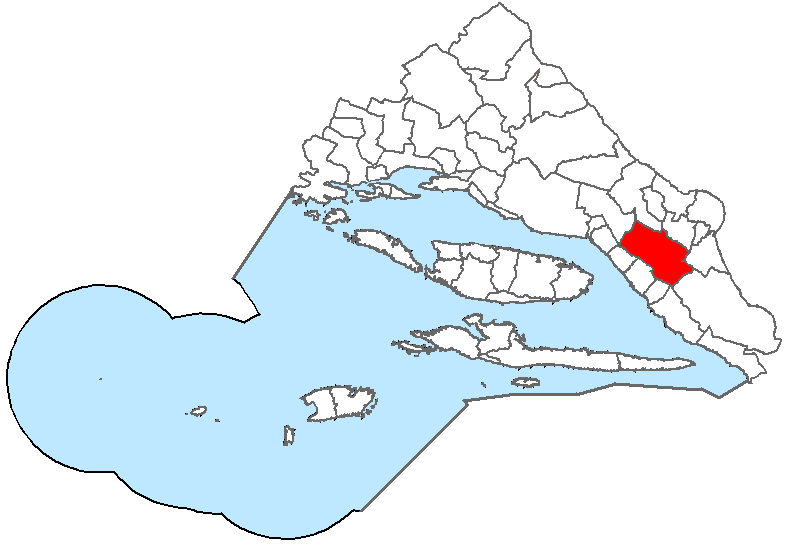
- Location of the Zagvozd Municipality within Split-Dalmatia County.
- Interactive map of Zagvozd
- Location within Croatia
- Country: Croatia
- Region: Dalmatian Hinterland
- County: Split-Dalmatia County

Area
  - Village and municipality: 138.8 km^{2} (53.6 sq mi)
  - Urban: 45.1 km^{2} (17.4 sq mi)

Population (2021)
  - Village and municipality: 957
  - Density: 6.89/km^{2} (17.9/sq mi)
  - Urban: 640
  - Urban density: 14/km^{2} (37/sq mi)
- Website: zagvozd.hr

Zagvozd is a village and a seat of Zagvozd municipality in the Split-Dalmatia County, Croatia. In 2021 it had a population of 957. It is located 18 km from Imotski, 15 km from Šestanovac, 18 km from Lovreć and 46 km from Vrgorac.

== Demographics ==
In 2021, the municipality had 957 residents in the following 7 settlements:

- Biokovsko Selo, population 41
- Krstatice, population 67
- Rastovac, population 146
- Rašćane Gornje, population 23
- Zagvozd, population 640
- Župa, population 37
- Župa Srednja, population 3
Zagvozd: Population trends 1857–2021
v

population	2522	2929	3176	3779	4461	5051	4758	4993	4760	5032	4656	4547	3288	2295	1642	1188	957
	1857	1869	1880	1890	1900	1910	1921	1931	1948	1953	1961	1971	1981	1991	2001	2011	2021

Sources: Croatian Bureau of Statistics publications

In 2011, 99% of the population were ethnic Croats.

== History ==
From 1941 to 1945, Zagvozd was part of the Independent State of Croatia. In the settlements of Zagvozd and Rastovac, at least 190 lost their lives over the course of the war.

Zagvozd was the site of a 1945 torture and massacre of 18 friars and civilians, committed by Yugoslav Partisans. Their remains were discovered in 2005. DNA analysis in Split revealed the identities of three of the victims as Franciscan friars from the town of Široki Brijeg. In 2007, the 15 unidentified bodies were buried in Zagvozd while the identified friars were buried in their native Široki Brijeg.

== Culture ==
Our Lady of Mount Carmel in Zagvozd

Zagvozd celebrates its municipal day on July 16 to coincide with the local celebration of the feast of Our Lady of Mount Carmel.
