= Glavina Donja =

Settlement in Split-Dalmatia County, Croatia

- Settlement
- Interactive map of Glavina Donja
- Location of Glavina Donja in Croatia
- Coordinates: 43°26′42″N 17°11′56″E
- Country: Croatia
- County: Split-Dalmatia
- City: Imotski

Area
  - Total: 9.0 km^{2} (3.5 sq mi)

Population (2021)
  - Total: 1,625
  - Density: 180/km^{2} (470/sq mi)
- Time zone: UTC+1 (CET)
  - Summer (DST): UTC+2 (CEST)
- Postal code: 21260 Imotski
- Area code: +385 (0)21

Glavina Donja is a settlement in the City of Imotski in Croatia. In 2021, its population was 1625.

== Demographics ==
Glavina Donja: Population trends 1857–2021
v

population	797		795	923	1099	1245	1152	1422	1272	1354	1471	1518	1661	1731	1770	1748	1625
	1857	1869	1880	1890	1900	1910	1921	1931	1948	1953	1961	1971	1981	1991	2001	2011	2021

Sources: Croatian Bureau of Statistics publications
