= Radica (disambiguation) =

Radica, Italian for briar root, may refer to:

- Bogdan Radica (1904–1993), Croatian historian, journalist, diplomat, writer
- Ruben Radica (1931–2021), Croatian composer
- Naselje Stjepana Radića, settlement (naselje) in Vrbovec, Zagreb County, Croatia
- Radica Games, United States company that produces electronic games, founded in 1983

== See also ==
- Radice
- Radici (disambiguation)
