= D10 road (Croatia) =

Expressway in central Croatia

D10 state road
- Podravski ipsilon

Route information
- Length: 34.9 km (21.7 mi) planned 86.4 km (53.7 mi)

Major junctions
- From: A4 in Sveta Helena interchange
- D41 in Vrbovec 1 interchange D26 in Dubrava interchange D28 in Gradec interchange

- To: D22 in Križevci interchange

Location
- Country: Croatia
- Counties: Zagreb County, Koprivnica-Križevci
- Major cities: Vrbovec, Križevci

Highway system
- Highways in Croatia

The D10 expressway is a partially built expressway in central Croatia northeast from Zagreb extending towards the city of Križevci. It is currently executed as a 35 km (14 mi) long expressway that spans from the A4 motorway Sveta Helena interchange via Vrbovec, to the city of Križevci. The D10 expressway represents the western arm of the so-called Podravina Y, as the eastern arm is planned to be the D12 expressway.

In 2008 the expressway was planned to be upgraded to a motorway called the A12 and extended northward to Križevci, Koprivnica and Gola, Koprivnica-Križevci County border crossing to Hungary. The motorway was criticised by media as an election campaign stunt. After suffering three years of construction works delays caused by complete absence of funding, Hrvatske autoceste announced cancellation of the motorway construction in May 2012. The 12.5-kilometre (7.8 mi) section between the Gradec interchange and the Križevci interchange opened in September 2016.

== History ==
=== Planned upgrade to motorway ===
A12 motorway
- Autocesta A12
- Podravski ipsilon
- in use under construction planned other motorways

Route information
- Length: 35 km (22 mi) planned 86 km (53 mi)

Major junctions
- From: A4 in Sveta Helena interchange
- D41 near Vrbovec D26 near Vrbovec

- To: D28 near Vrbovec

Location
- Country: Croatia
- Counties: Zagreb, Koprivnica-Križevci
- Major cities: Vrbovec, Križevci

Highway system
- Highways in Croatia

The A12 motorway (Croatian: Autocesta A12) was a planned extension of the expressway northward to Križevci, Koprivnica and Gola border crossing to Hungary in 2008.

The eastern arm of the so-called Podravina Y, was planned to become the A13 motorway. The latter was planned to branch off from the A12 at the Vrbovec 2 interchange, which is largely completed, although it may not be used by motorists driving on the A12 as that exit is blocked.

The A12 motorway was scheduled to be extended towards Koprivnica and Gola border crossing to Hungary, while the existing 23 km (14 mi) long section was planned to be widened to include emergency lanes thus upgrading it to motorway standards. The next section scheduled to be completed was 20-kilometre (12 mi) section between Gradec interchange (inclusive) and Kloštar Vojakovački, where the motorway would default to the D41 state road. Four motorway exits were planned on that section: Gradec to the D28 state road towards Bjelovar and Vrbovec (eastern approach), Križevci to the D22 state road and Križevci, and Lemeš to a business park near Križevci. The works related to the section were officially announced in 2009, however no substantial works were carried out for more than a year. In May 2010, the construction works were announced once again and scheduled to start by autumn of 2010. At the time, the motorway was expected to be completed before 2013.

Further works were also planned, however no start of construction was ever scheduled. The subsequent A12 sections were planned to bypass Koprivnica to the east of the city and reach Gola border crossing to Hungary. Those sections are not described by publications in such great detail as the previous one, although Sokolovac motorway exit is defined by means of its chainage and slip road. Also a motorway exit north of Koprivnica is mentioned by Hrvatske autoceste and Croatian Motorway Concessionaires Association publications.

The A12 had been formally announced in May 2009, but actual project planning, issuing of permits and construction works were delayed and postponed to an undetermined date, drawing criticism of the project as a pre-election stunt for the local elections of 2009. On 2 May 2012, management of Hrvatske autoceste announced cancellation of construction of the motorway, pending approval of its supervisory board. The company reported that funding was never secured for construction of the route, while declining to comment on possible payment of damages to contractors. By May 2012, Strabag, an A12 contractor, demanded 30 million kuna (c. 4 million euro) in damages because of delay of construction, but the request was declined by Hrvatske autoceste citing failure of Strabag to fulfill its contractual obligations. On 20 June 2012, the Government of Croatia cancelled construction of the motorway.

== Traffic volume ==
Traffic is regularly counted and reported by Hrvatske ceste, operator of the road.

D10 traffic volume
Road	Counting site	AADT	ASDT	Notes
D10	2008 Sveta Helena	11,602	11,526	Between the Sveta Helena interchange (A4) and D41 junction.
D10	2030 Vrbovec bypass	4,650	4,087	Between the D41 and Ž3079 junctions.

== Exit list ==
County	km	Exit	Name	Destination	Notes
Zagreb County	0.0	/	Sveta Helena	A4 E65 E71 Ž3016	Connection to Zagreb and Varaždin (via the A4) and to Rakovec, Sveta Helena and Donja Zelina (D3) (via the Ž3016). The southern terminus of the expressway.
Zagreb County	8.0	1	Vrbovec 1	Ž3034	Connection to Vrbovec (via Luka), Križevci and Koprivnica (to the northeast) and to Dugo Selo (to the southwest).
Zagreb County			Luka rest area		
Zagreb County		2	Prilesje	Ž3079	Connection to Vrbovec via Savska Cesta.
Zagreb County		3	Dubrava	D26 Ž3288	Connection to Vrbovec (via the Ž3288) and to Dubrava and Čazma via the (D26).
Zagreb County		4	Vrbovec 2	D12	Connection to Farkaševac and Bjelovar via D544 state road.
Zagreb County	22.5	-	Cugovec	D28 Ž3052	Level intersection, connection to Vrbovec via the Ž3052 and to Bjelovar via the D28 state road. This intersection was operational since 2007, but closed in 2014 in anticipation of the completion of the Gradec interchange.
Zagreb County	23.0	5	Gradec	D28 Ž3052	Connection to Vrbovec via the Ž3052 and to Sveti Ivan Žabno and Bjelovar via the D28 state road. Opened in 2016.
Koprivnica-Križevci		6	Križevci	D22	Connection to Križevci. Currently the northern terminus of the expressway.
Koprivnica-Križevci		7	Lemeš	-	Connection to Lemeš business zone north of Križevci.
Koprivnica-Križevci	52.9	8	Sokolovac	Ž2181	Connection to the D41 state road south of Koprivnica. The northernmost extent of the route designed in detail.
1.000 mi = 1.609 km; 1.000 km = 0.621 mi: Closed/former; Unopened
