= Topolovac =

Topolovac may refer to:

== Croatia ==
- Topolovac, Sisak-Moslavina County, a village near Sisak
- Zrinski Topolovac, a village in Bjelovar-Bilogora County

Topolovec

- Topolovec, a village near Vrbovec, Zagreb County
- Topolovec Pisarovinski, a village near Pisarovina, Zagreb County

== Serbia ==
- Ravni Topolovac, a village in Serbia

== See also ==
- Dunafalva, a village in Bács-Kiskun county, Hungary
- Topolovățu Mare, a village in Timiș County, Romania
