= Sveta Helena =

Sveta Helena may refer to:

- Sveta Helena, Zagreb County, a village near Sveti Ivan Zelina, Croatia
- Sveta Helena, Koprivnica-Križevci County, a village near Križevci, Croatia
