= Nova Kapela, Zagreb County =

Nova Kapela
- Naselje
- Location of Nova Kapela within Croatia
- Coordinates: 45°53′8″N 16°34′28″E
- Country: Croatia
- County: Zagreb County
- Municipality: Dubrava

Area
  - Total: 13.4 km^{2} (5.2 sq mi)

Population (2021)
  - Total: 207
  - Density: 15.4/km^{2} (40.0/sq mi)
- Time zone: UTC+1 (CET)
  - Summer (DST): UTC+2 (CEST)
- Postal code: 10343
- Area code: +385 (0) 1

Nova Kapela is a settlement (Croatian: naselje) within the Dubrava municipality (Croatian: općina) of Zagreb County in Croatia. According to the 2011 census, it has 243 inhabitants. It is thus the second-most populous settlement in its municipality, right after Dubrava, the eponymous one. The place is located 6 kilometers (3.7 mi) from the Dubrava settlement and a 60 km (37 mi) from Zagreb, the Croatian capital. The main road leading through the settlement is the county route Ž3042. The association football team Croatia plays in Nova Kapela. The alignment of the planned extension of the B28 expressway into A13 highway passes north of Nova Kapela. Prior to the 1991 Yugoslav wars the name of the town was Srpska Kapela.
