= D12 (disambiguation) =

D12 is an American hip-hop group originating from Detroit, Michigan.

D12 may also refer to:

== Military transport ==
- ARA Heroína (D-12), a 1983 Argentine Navy MEKO 360H2 series destroyer
- Albatros D.XII, a 1918 German single-seat fighter biplane
- Pfalz D.XII, a 1918 German fighter aircraft
- HMS Striker (D12), a 1942 British converted aircraft carrier
- D-12 Almirante Clemente, a Venezuelan Navy Almirante Clemente class destroyer
- D-12 armoured car, a Soviet military vehicle of the early 1930s
- Dewoitine D.12, a French fighter aircraft

== Civilian transport ==
- Spyker D12, a luxury vehicle made by Dutch car company Spyker
- Bavarian D XII, an 1897 German steam locomotive model
- Curtiss D-12, a 1923 aircraft engine
- GS&WR Class D12, a Great Southern and Western Railway Irish steam locomotive

== Other uses ==
- A nickname for DirecTV-12, a DirecTV satellite
- D12, part of the Allis-Chalmers D Series of tractors
- A nickname for NBA All-Star Dwight Howard, whose jersey number is 12
- d12, a twelve-sided polyhedral die used in many games
- Dublin 12, a postal district of Dublin, Ireland
- Familial adenomatous polyposis, a cancerous condition (ICD-10 code: D12)
- Acronym for Double 12, mean two tanks with 12 liter in Scuba diving
- D12, the eldest eaglet from the 2012 clutch of the Decorah Bald Eagles
- D12 road (Croatia), a state road in central Croatia
- DVCPRO HD (D-12), a professional digital high definition video format
