= 1976 Zagreb mid-air collision =

Fatal collision of passenger flights over Yugoslavia (now Croatia)

1976 Zagreb mid-air collision British Airways Flight 476 · Inex-Adria Aviopromet Flight 550
Accident
- Date: 10 September 1976
- Summary: Mid-air collision due to understaffing
- Site: Samoborec, Croatia, Yugoslavia (now present-day Croatia); 45°53′33″N 16°18′38″E
- Total fatalities: 176
- Total survivors: 0

First aircraft
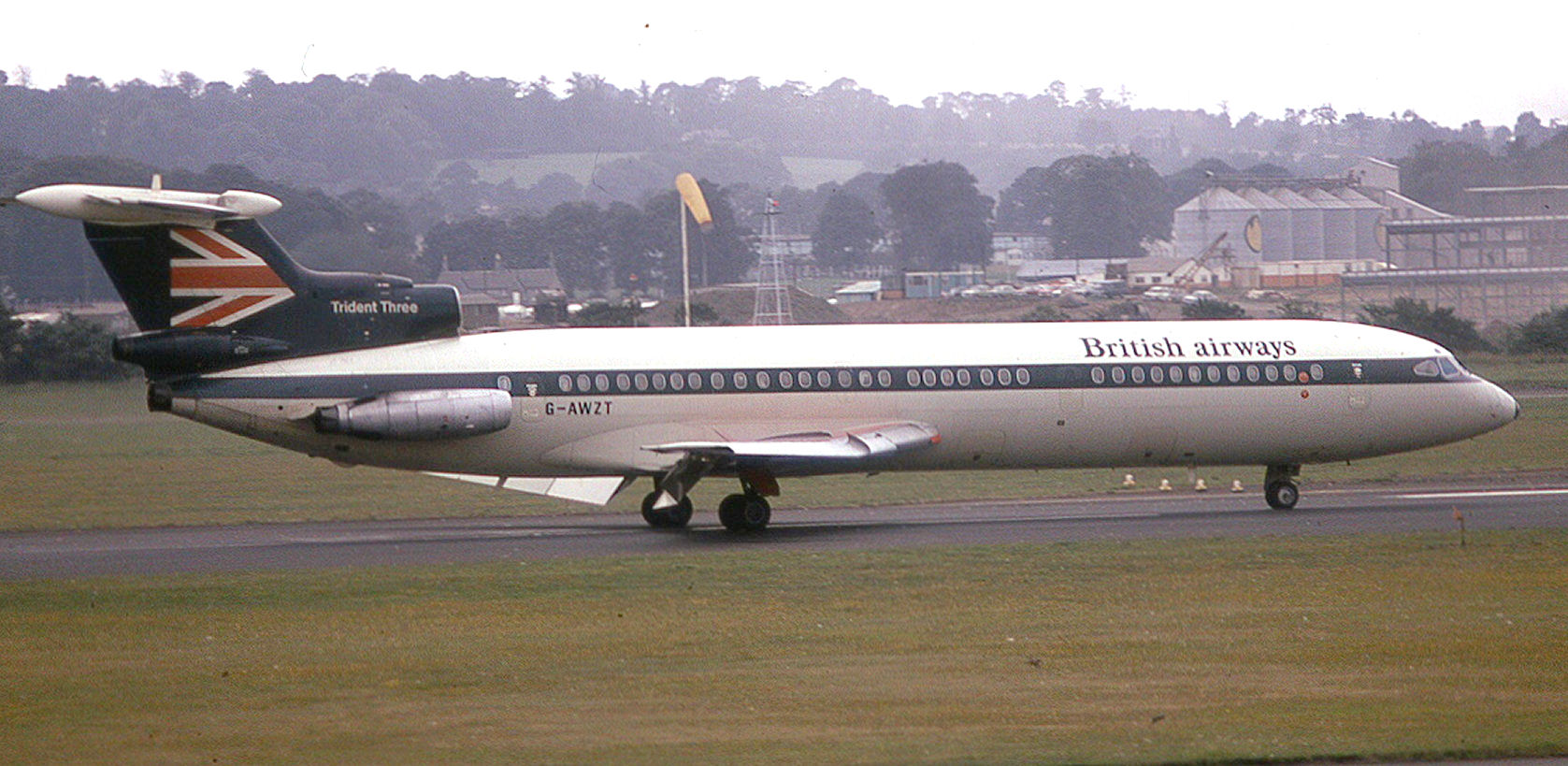
- G-AWZT, the Hawker Siddeley Trident 3B involved in the collision
- Type: Hawker Siddeley Trident 3B
- Operator: British Airways
- IATA flight No.: BA476
- ICAO flight No.: BAW476
- Call sign: BEALINE 476 (Note: The callsign for British Airways is "Speedbird", inherited from BOAC. However, this aircraft in particular, G-AWZT, was a former British European Airways aircraft, and kept the "Bealine" callsign at the time of the collision.)
- Registration: G-AWZT
- Flight origin: Heathrow Airport; London, United Kingdom
- Destination: Yeşilköy International Airport; Istanbul, Turkey
- Occupants: 63
- Passengers: 54
- Crew: 9
- Fatalities: 63
- Survivors: 0

Second aircraft
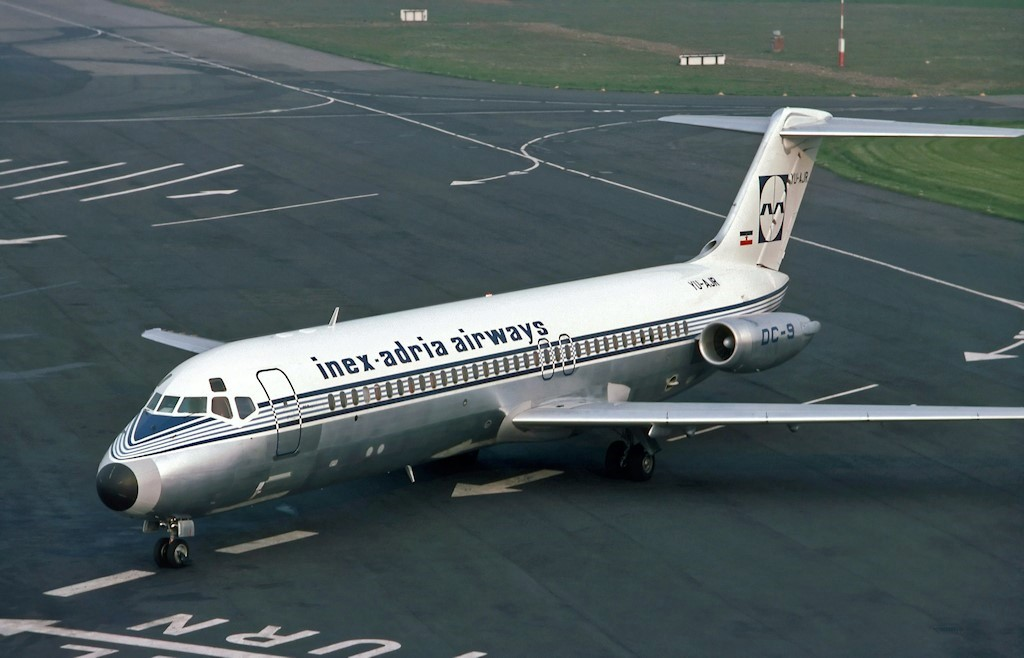
- YU-AJR, the McDonnell Douglas DC-9-32 involved in the collision
- Type: McDonnell Douglas DC-9-32
- Operator: Inex-Adria Aviopromet
- IATA flight No.: JP550
- ICAO flight No.: ADR550
- Call sign: ADRIA 550
- Registration: YU-AJR
- Flight origin: Split Airport; Split, SR Croatia, Yugoslavia
- Destination: Cologne Bonn Airport; Cologne, West Germany
- Occupants: 113
- Passengers: 108
- Crew: 5
- Fatalities: 113
- Survivors: 0

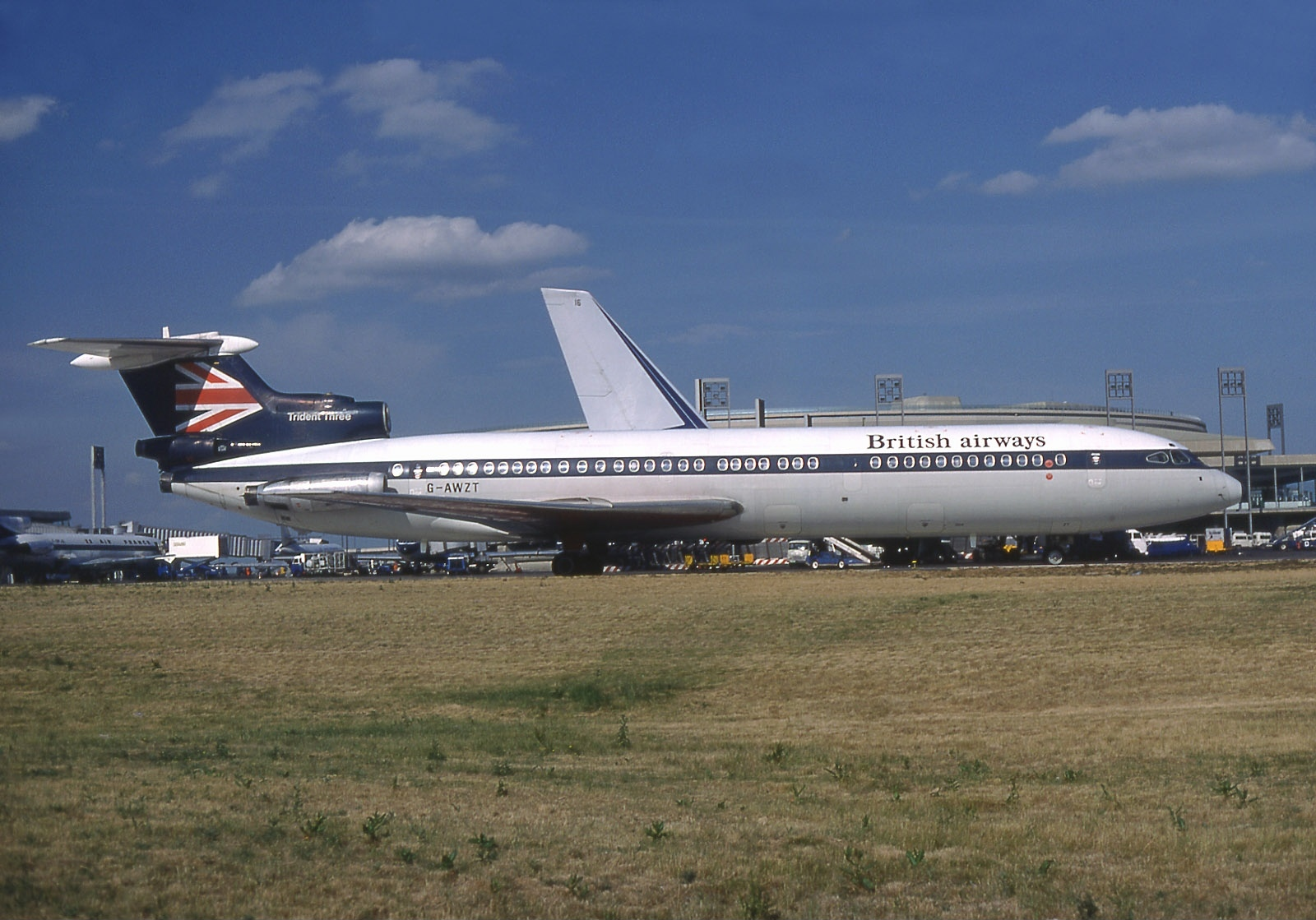
One of the planes involved in the accident photographed in June 1976

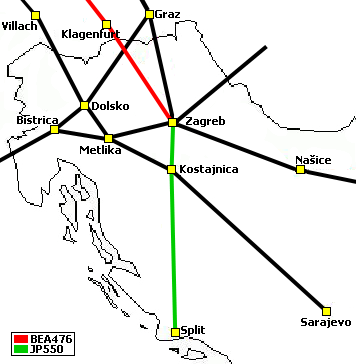
Zagreb FIR in 1976, showing route of BA476 (red) and JP550 (green). Not to scale.

The 1976 Zagreb mid-air collision was a mid-air collision that took place on September 10, 1976, when British Airways Flight 476 en route from London to Istanbul, collided mid-air with Inex-Adria Aviopromet Flight 550 en route from Split, SFR Yugoslavia, to Cologne, West Germany, near Zagreb in modern-day Croatia. The collision was the result of a procedural error on the part of air traffic controllers in Zagreb.

All 176 people aboard the two aircraft were killed, making it the world's deadliest mid-air collision at the time. It remains the deadliest aviation accident in Yugoslav and Croatian history. This is also the only British Airways accident to result in fatalities excluding subsidiaries or former identities.

== Background ==
=== Flights ===
British Airways Flight 476 departed London Heathrow Airport for Istanbul Atatürk Airport at 08:32 UTC as flight BA476, with fifty-four passengers on board and a crew of nine. The flight crew of the Hawker Siddeley Trident consisted of Captain Dennis Tann (44), First Officer Brian Helm, and Flight Engineer Martin Flint. Captain Tann was highly experienced, having logged 10,781 flying hours by the time of the accident.

Inex-Adria Flight 550 departed Split Airport at 09:48 UTC (10:48 local time) bound for Cologne Bonn Airport as flight JP550. It carried 108 passengers, mostly German holiday-makers returning home at the end of a holiday on the Dalmatian coast, and a crew of five. The flight crew consisted of Captain Jože Krumpak (51), an experienced pilot with 10,157 flying hours, and First Officer Dušan Ivanuš. Inex-Adria was a charter airline based in Slovenia, the northernmost of the constituent republics making up SFR Yugoslavia.

Both flights proceeded uneventfully until they approached the Zagreb VOR.

=== Air traffic control ===
In the mid-1970s, the Zagreb air traffic control region was one of the busiest in Europe despite being seriously understaffed and poorly equipped. The Zagreb VOR was a reporting point for a number of congested airways between northern Europe and southeastern Europe, the Middle East, and beyond. The airspace was divided into three sectors by altitude: the lower sector below 25,000 feet (7,600 m), the middle sector from 25,000–31,000 feet (7,600–9,400 m), and the upper sector above 31,000 feet (9,400 m).

== Accident ==
On entering Yugoslav airspace from Austria, BA476 established radio contact with the Zagreb ACC upper-sector controller Gradimir Tasić at 10:04:12 UTC (11:04:12 local time), informing him that they were at Flight Level 330 (33,000 ft; 10,050 m) and expected to reach the Zagreb VOR at 10:14. The controller responded by instructing them to select transponder code 2312, and to call again on reaching the VOR:

10:04:12	BA476	Zagreb, Bealine 476, good morning.
	Zagreb Upp	Bealine 476, good morning, go ahead.
10:04:19	BA476	Er, 476, is Klagenfurt at 02, 330 and estimating Zagreb at one four.
10:04:27	Zagreb Upp	Bealine 476, roger, call me passing Zagreb, flight level 330, Squawk Alpha 2312.
10:04:40	BA476	2312 is coming.

This was the last communication with the Trident aircraft before the accident.

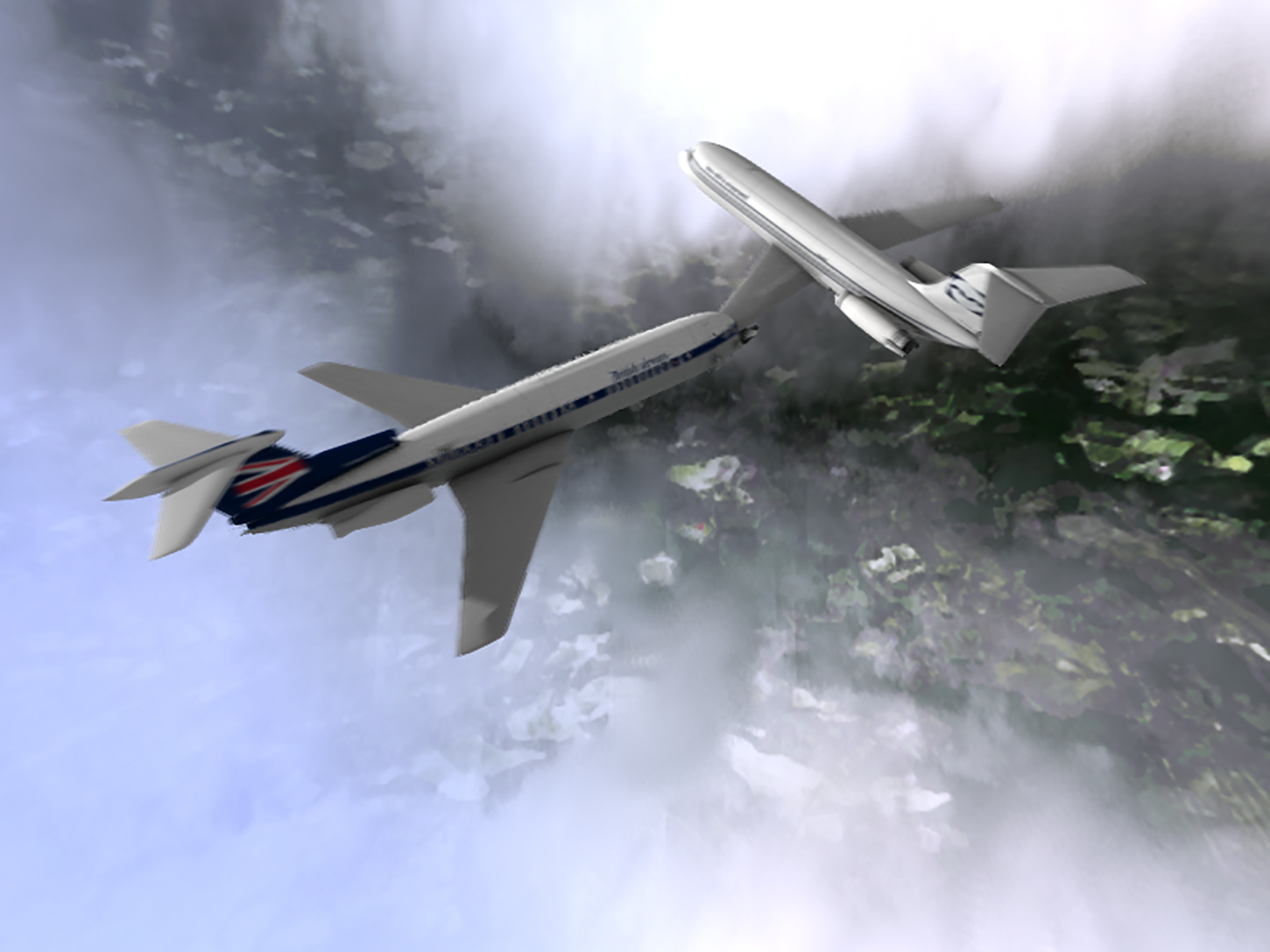
Digital artwork depicting the mid-air collision

At around the same time, JP550 contacted middle-sector controller Bojan Erjavec asking for a higher flight level; the aircraft was at flight level 260 (approximately 26,000 feet (7,900 m)). FL280 (28,000 feet (8,500 m)) and FL310 (31,000 feet (9,400 m)) were unavailable, so Erjavec informed JP550 of the situation and offered flight level 350 (approximately 35,000 feet (11,000 m)), which the pilots accepted. To get clearance for a higher level, it was necessary to obtain the permission of the upper-sector controller. Erjavec waved his hand to get Tasić's attention, but Tasić (who was working the upper sector on his own, as his colleague Mladen Hochberger had gone to search for Nenad Tepeš, Tasić's replacement who was running late) was far too busy to be interrupted. Middle sector controller Gradimir Pelin was then instructed to co-ordinate the climbout for the DC-9 with Tasić.

According to Pelin, he walked to the upper sector console holding JP550's flight progress strip. He asked Tasić if the DC-9 could climb to FL350. Tasić took the strip from Pelin and looked at it, then asked where the aircraft was at the moment. Pelin then pointed to a blip on the screen approaching Kostajnica, Bosnia and Herzegovina. Tasić's response was 'yes, it could climb'. Pelin then noticed an aircraft on the screen coming from the direction of Metlika and asked Tasić about it, who said 'wait until they cross.' Pelin referred to the middle-sector screen to make sure that he had identified the DC-9 positively on the upper-sector screen. He then returned to Tasić and they both watched the targets pass each other, at which point Tasić authorised JP550 to climb. Pelin then called out to Erjavec and said, 'Yes, climb it.' Upon Erjavec receiving the OK from Pelin, he instructed the DC-9 to climb to FL350. That was at 10:07:40.

At 10:12:03, JP550 called the Zagreb middle-sector controller to inform them that the aircraft was out of flight level 310. The last instructions given by Erjavec to JP550 were to call the upper-sector controller on 134.45 MHz and to stop squawking the assigned squawk code. By instructing JP550 to squawk Standby, Erjavec simply released a code allocated for the middle sector. The data tag for the DC-9 would now disappear from his screen and the aircraft would become merely a point among many others. If everything about this handover had been normal, the DC-9 would have been given a new code on initial contact with the upper sector controller and would have been positively identified on the upper sector screen with its flight number and altitude readout. But this had not been a normal handover because of the ill-handled co-ordination for the climb. Also, Tasić was busy with other traffic and JP550 did not immediately contact the upper-sector controller. This could have been because the frequency was busy, but the pilots might also have delayed the call for some unknown reason.

By the time JP550 contacted the upper-sector controller at 10:14:04 it had reached the Zagreb VOR and was already climbing through flight level 325 (approximately 32,500 feet (9,900 m)). The controller immediately asked for confirmation of the aircraft's level:

10:14:04	JP550	Dobar dan ["Good day"] Zagreb, Adria 550.
10:14:07	Zagreb Upp	Adria 550, Zagreb, dobar dan, go ahead.
10:14:10	JP550	325 crossing Zagreb at one four.
10:14:14	Zagreb Upp	What is your present level?
10:14:17	JP550	327.

Realising the imminent danger of collision, Tasić instructed the JP550 to stop climbing. In doing so, he reverted to his native Serbo-Croatian language, contrary to the regulations. This meant that the British Airways plane, even if they overheard this conversation, would have very little chance of understanding their own imminent danger. The controller's last-ditch attempt to avert catastrophe turned what would have been a near miss into the collision he was trying to prevent. For, by the time JP550 had levelled off it was at flight level 330 (approximately 33,000 feet (10,000 m)), exactly the same level as BA476:

10:14:22	Zagreb Upp	[stammering] ... e... zadržite se na toj visini i javite prolazak Zagreba ["uh... hold your current altitude and report passing Zagreb"].
10:14:27	JP550	Kojoj visini? ["What altitude?"]
10:14:29	Zagreb Upp	Na kojoj ste sada u penjanju jer... e... imate avion pred vama na... [not coherent] 335 sa leva na desno. ["The altitude you are climbing through because... uh... you have an aircraft in front of you at... [not coherent] 335 from left to right."]
10:14:38	JP550	OK, ostajemo točno 330. ["OK, we'll remain precisely at 330."]

The mid-air collision occurred at 10:14:41. Half a minute later, Tasić attempted to call BA476 and instruct it to report passing the next waypoint at Našice, but was answered by a different flight:

10:15:06	Zagreb Upp	Bealine 476, Zagreb... report passing Nasice.
10:15:12	BE778	Beatours 778, were you calling...?
10:15:14	Zagreb Upp	Negative.

Tasić continued to call BA476 and JP550, ignoring calls from other aircraft, but to no avail:

10:15:50	Zagreb Upp	Adria 550, Zagreb...
10:16:00	Zagreb Upp	Adria 550, Zagreb...
10:16:14	Zagreb Upp	Adria 550, Zagreb...
10:16:32	Zagreb Upp	Adria 550, Zagreb...
10:16:42	Zagreb Upp	Adria 550, Zagreb...
10:16:50	Zagreb Upp	Bealine 476, Zagreb...
10:16:58	Zagreb Upp	Bealine 476, Zagreb...

Meanwhile, a Lufthansa Boeing 737 was travelling eastbound on UB5 at flight level 290 (approximately 29,000 feet (8,800 m)) towards Zagreb, only 15 miles (13 nmi; 24 km) behind the Trident. The co-pilot saw the collision as a flash of lightning and afterwards, out of a ball of smoke, two aircraft falling towards the ground. The Lufthansa captain, Josef Kröse, reported the sighting to Erjavec, the middle-sector controller.

10:15:40	Capt Kröse R/T	....e Zagreb! It is possible we have a mid-air collision in sight. We have two aircraft going down, well, almost below our position now.

This was spoken in such an agitated voice that Erjavec was unable to understand what was being said. (Later, on hearing the recording of this call, Captain Kröse had difficulty in understanding his own words.) The Lufthansa captain had to repeat his message several times.

10:18:12	Capt Kröse R/T	It is possible that the other aircraft ahead of us had a mid-air collision....er...just overhead Zagreb. We had two aircraft going down with a rapid rate of descent...and there was also smoke coming out.

When the implications of what was being said dawned on Erjavec, he glanced across to the upper-sector controller. At his station sat a stunned Tasić, white-faced with shock. Slowly he lifted the headset from his ears and placed it on the console in front of him.

The two aircraft had collided over the town of Vrbovec, northeast of Zagreb. The last five metres of the DC-9's left wing had cut through the Trident's cockpit section and forward passenger compartment.

The pilots of the Trident were killed at the moment of collision. The explosive decompression caused the forward part of the Trident's fuselage to disintegrate; the Trident fell, landing on its tail and sliding a short distance before its remains came to rest near the village of Gaj.

The DC-9, now without over one-third of its left wing, went into an immediate nose-dive and slammed into the ground right-wing first, near the village of Dvorišće near Rakovec, 25 seconds after the collision. The CVR had reactivated at the moment of collision, having stopped recording 20 minutes earlier.

Everyone aboard both aircraft was killed.

=== Initial survivors ===
A police officer who was one of the first to arrive at the scene reported that a baby on the ground was "still giving feeble signs of life near the [British] plane, but even if the ambulances had arrived before me, it would have been too late to save it." Locals reported finding a boy, who was lying on a road near a field, and who displayed signs of life up to 15 minutes after the collision, but he eventually died.

== Trial ==
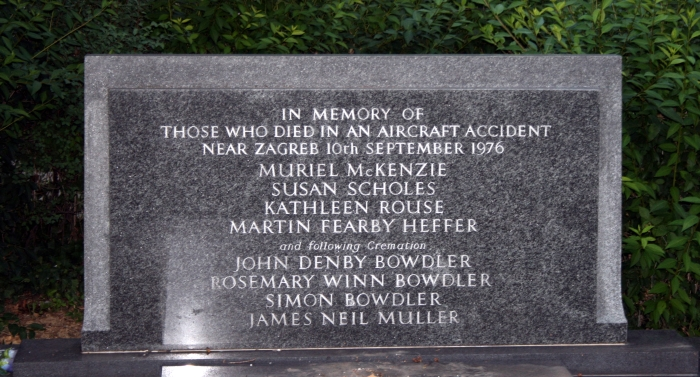
Memorial to some of the victims of the British Airways flight. Dr. Denby Bowdler was a renowned Australian Pediatric Radiologist, returning to Sydney. Muriel McKenzie was the wife of Ian McKenzie, British Vice-Consul In Istanbul.

By noon that day, all controllers were in custody for interrogation. Later, all were released except Tasić, who remained in custody until the trial.

The trial opened on 11 April 1977 in Zagreb District Court. All the controllers were indicted under the Penal Code of Yugoslavia, Articles 271–72 as "persons who by endangering railway, sea or air traffic, threaten the lives of persons or property."

Tasić was the only one to be found guilty; he was sentenced to seven years imprisonment. After a petition by air traffic controllers, it was determined that Tasić had been used as a scapegoat, and he was released on 29 November 1978, having served nearly two years and three months in prison.

== In popular culture ==
A dramatised reconstruction of the events leading up to the accident, starring Antony Sher and entitled Collision Course, was made by Granada Television in 1979.

The events of the accident are also documented in a season 1 episode of Aircrash Confidential titled "Collisions", which was first aired on the Discovery Channel in 2011.

== See also ==
- 1973 Nantes mid-air collision
- 2001 Japan Airlines mid-air incident - Near miss incident due to ATC error
- 2002 Überlingen mid-air collision - Another mid-air collision also attributed to ATC error
