= Martinska Ves =

Martinska Ves may refer to:

- Martinska Ves, Sisak-Moslavina County, a village in Croatia
- Martinska Ves, Zagreb County, a village in Croatia
