= Conac =

Conac or CONAC may refer to:

- Konak (Sečanj), known in Romanian as Conac, a village in Serbia
- Continental Air Command, or ConAC, in the United States

== See also ==
- Gilbert-Amable Faure-Conac, French army officer
- Connac, a commune in France
- Konak (disambiguation)
