= Radice =

Radice is a surname of Italian origin which may refer to:

- Anne-Imelda Radice (born 1948), American art museum director and arts administrator
- Attilia Radice (1914–1980), Italian ballerina
- Barbara Radice (born 1943), Italian design critic, writer, and editor
- Betty Radice (1912–1985), British literary editor and translator
- Carlo Radice (1907–?), Italian footballer
- Casimiro Radice (1834–1908), Italian painter
- Frank Radice (born 1949), American television industry executive, businessman and author
- Gabriela Radice (born 1968), Argentine journalist
- Gerolamo Radice (1883–1948), Italian professional footballer
- Giles Radice, Baron Radice (1936–2022), British politician
- Giovanni Lombardo Radice (1954–2023), Italian film actor
- Giuseppe Lombardo Radice (1879–1938), Italian pedagogist and philosopher
- Julius J. Radice (1908–1966), American physician and athlete
- Luca Radice (born 1987), Swiss-Italian football coach and former footballer
- Lucio Lombardo-Radice (1916–1982), Italian mathematician
- Luigi Radice (1935–2018), Italian football player and manager
- Mario Radice (1898–1987), Italian painter
- Mark Radice (born 1957), American singer/musician and producer
- Raul Radice (1902–1988), Italian writer
- Vittorio Radice (born 1957), Italian businessman and retail manager
- William Radice (born 1951), British poet, writer and translator

== See also ==
- Radica (disambiguation)
- Radical (disambiguation)
- Radici (disambiguation)
