= Žunci =

Coordinates: 45°57′N 16°26′E

- Settlement
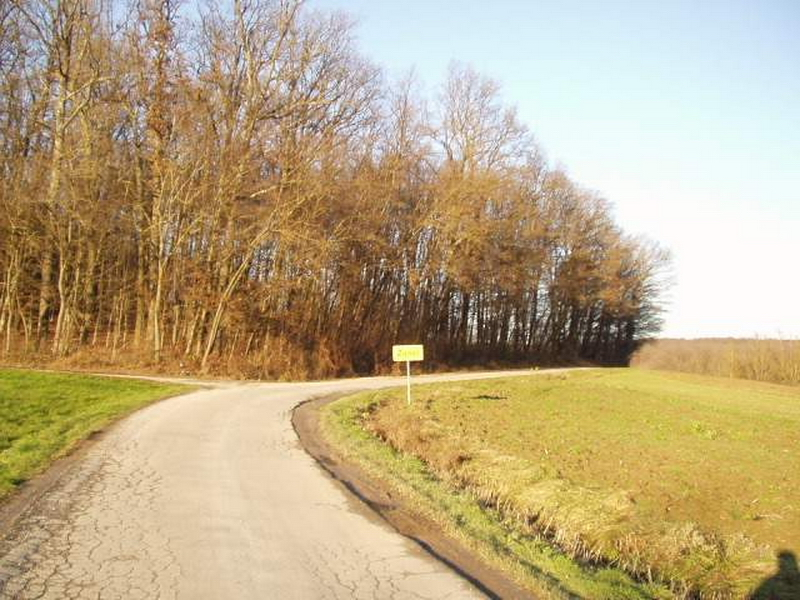
- Žunci Entrance

- Location within Croatia
- Country: Croatia
- County: Zagreb
- City: Vrbovec

Area
  - Total: 3.4 km^{2} (1.3 sq mi)

Population (2021)
  - Total: 125
  - Density: 37/km^{2} (95/sq mi)
- Time zone: UTC+1 (CET)
  - Summer (DST): UTC+2 (CEST)

Žunci is a settlement (naselje) in the Vrbovec administrative territory of Zagreb County, Croatia. As of 2011 it had a population of 167 people.
