= Peskovec =

Coordinates: 45°52′N 16°19′E

- Settlement
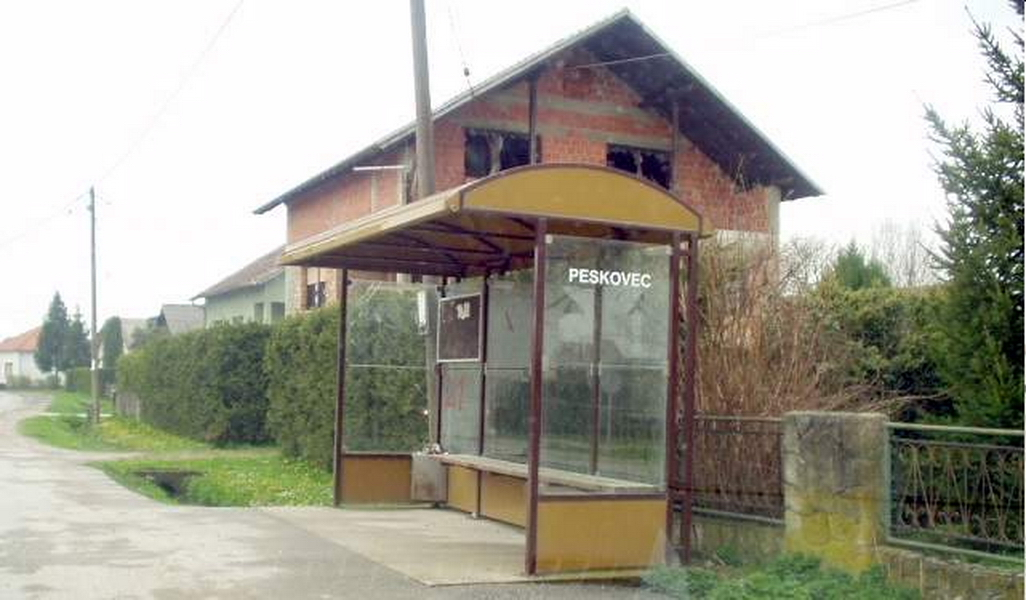
- Peskovec Bus station panoramic.jpg

- Location within Croatia
- Country: Croatia
- County: Zagreb
- City: Vrbovec

Area
  - Total: 4.3 km^{2} (1.7 sq mi)

Population (2021)
  - Total: 277
  - Density: 64/km^{2} (170/sq mi)
- Time zone: UTC+1 (CET)
  - Summer (DST): UTC+2 (CEST)

Peskovec is a settlement (naselje) in the Vrbovec administrative territory of Zagreb County, Croatia. As of 2011 it had a population of 323 people.
