= Đivan =

- Settlement
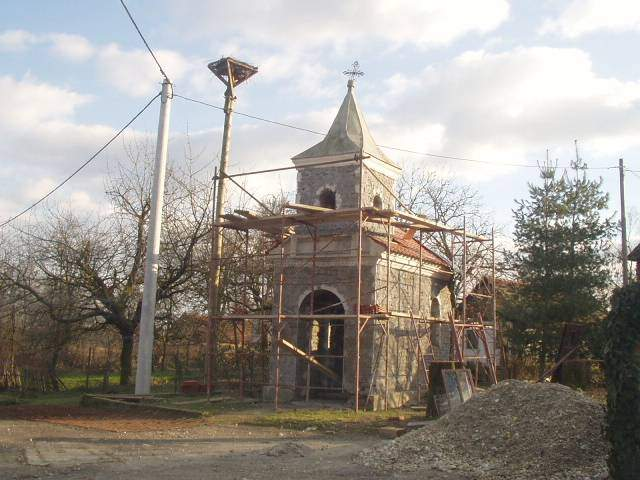
- Chapel under construction in Đivan

- Location within Croatia
- Coordinates: 45.90953043351937°N 16.4442541583173030°E
- Country: Croatia
- County: Zagreb
- City: Vrbovec

Area
  - Total: 1.1 km^{2} (0.42 sq mi)

Population (2021)
  - Total: 29
  - Density: 26/km^{2} (68/sq mi)
- Time zone: UTC+1 (CET)
  - Summer (DST): UTC+2 (CEST)

Đivan is a settlement (naselje) in the Vrbovec administrative territory of Zagreb County, Croatia. As of 2011 it had a population of 32 people.
