= Novo Selo, Zagreb County =

Novo Selo
- Settlement
- Location within Croatia
- Coordinates: 45.863°N 16.388°E
- Country: Croatia
- County: Zagreb
- City: Vrbovec

Area
  - Total: 4.9 km^{2} (1.9 sq mi)

Population (2021)
  - Total: 80
  - Density: 16/km^{2} (42/sq mi)
- Time zone: UTC+1 (CET)
  - Summer (DST): UTC+2 (CEST)

Novo Selo is a settlement (naselje) in the Vrbovec administrative territory of Zagreb County, Croatia. As of 2011 it had a population of 123 people. The etymology of the village comes from Slavic languages meaning new village, Novo Selo.
