= Greda, Zagreb County =

Greda
- Settlement
- Location within Croatia
- Country: Croatia
- County: Zagreb
- City: Vrbovec

Population (2011)
  - Total: 96
- Time zone: UTC+1 (CET)
  - Summer (DST): UTC+2 (CEST)

Greda is a settlement (naselje) in the Vrbovec administrative territory of Zagreb County, Croatia. As of 2011 it had a population of 96 people.
