= Dijaneš =

Coordinates: 45°54′N 16°21′E

- Settlement
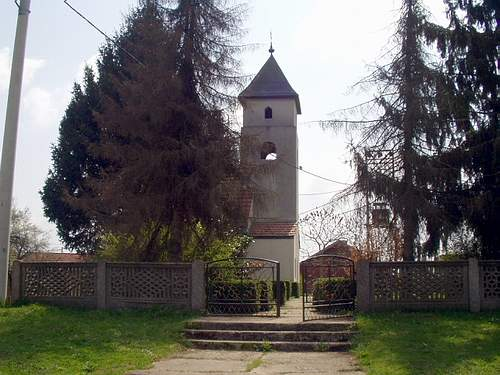
- a chapel in the center of Dijaneš

- Location within Croatia
- Country: Croatia
- County: Zagreb
- City: Vrbovec

Area
  - Total: 2.2 km^{2} (0.85 sq mi)

Population (2021)
  - Total: 158
  - Density: 72/km^{2} (190/sq mi)
- Time zone: UTC+1 (CET)
  - Summer (DST): UTC+2 (CEST)

Dijaneš is a settlement (naselje) in the Vrbovec administrative territory of Zagreb County, Croatia. As of 2011 it had a population of 167 people.
