= Lonjica =

Coordinates: 45°51′N 16°20′E

- Settlement
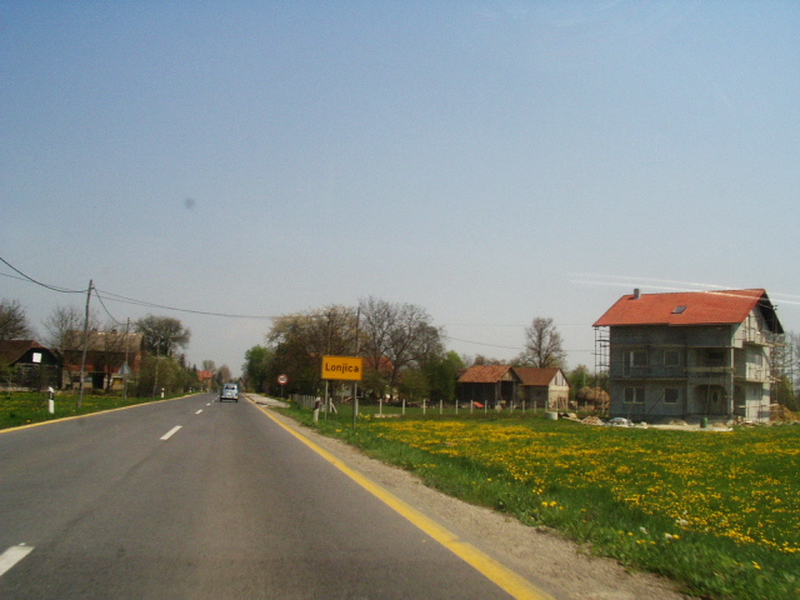
- Lonjica - Entrance

- Location within Croatia
- Country: Croatia
- County: Zagreb
- City: Vrbovec

Area
  - Total: 15.1 km^{2} (5.8 sq mi)

Population (2021)
  - Total: 821
  - Density: 54.4/km^{2} (141/sq mi)
- Time zone: UTC+1 (CET)
  - Summer (DST): UTC+2 (CEST)

Lonjica is a settlement (naselje) in the Vrbovec administrative territory of Zagreb County, Croatia. As of 2011 it had a population of 1,020 people.
