= Samoborec =

- Settlement
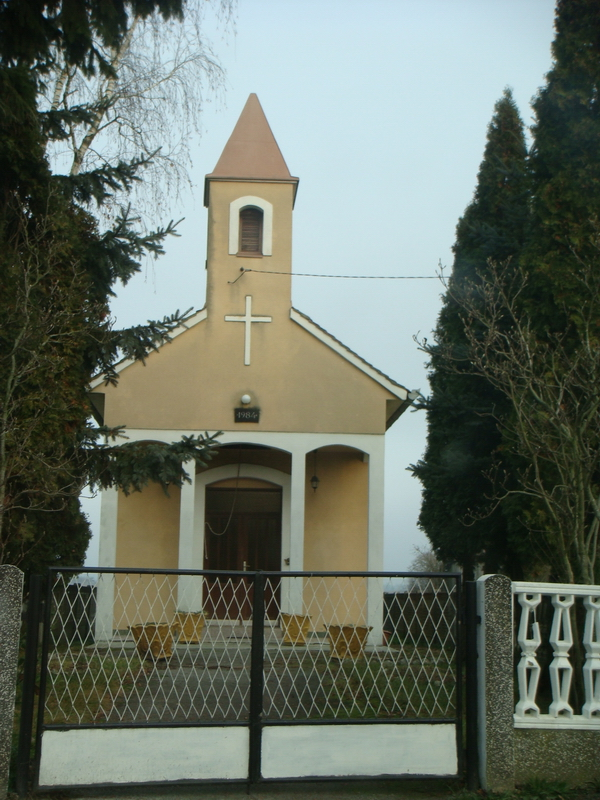
- A chapel in Samoborec

- Location within Croatia
- Coordinates: 45°54′N 16°19′E
- Country: Croatia
- County: Zagreb
- City: Vrbovec

Area
  - Total: 1.8 km^{2} (0.69 sq mi)

Population (2021)
  - Total: 103
  - Density: 57/km^{2} (150/sq mi)
- Time zone: UTC+1 (CET)
  - Summer (DST): UTC+2 (CEST)

Samoborec is a settlement (naselje) in the Vrbovec administrative territory of Zagreb County, Croatia. As of 2011 it had a population of 117 people. It is known for being the site of the 1976 Zagreb mid-air collision.
