= Konak =

Konak may refer to:

== Places and buildings ==
=== Turkey ===
- Konak (residence), a name for a house in Turkey and territories of the former Ottoman Empire
- Konak, Baklan
- Konak, Eğil
- Konak, Hakkari, Turkey
- Konak, İzmir, a district of İzmir Province, Turkey
  - Konak (İzmir Metro), Turkey
  - Konak Square, a square in Konak district of Izmir, Turkey
- Konak, Mengen, Turkey
- Konak, Ulus, Turkey

=== Elsewhere ===
- Konak, nickname for Hadjigeorgakis Kornesios Mansion (Cyprus Ethnological Museum) in Nicosia, Cyprus
- Konak (Sečanj), a village in Vojvodina, Serbia
- Konak (Thessaloniki), an Ottoman-era building in central Thessaloniki, Greece
- Konak, Cetinje, a village in the municipality of Cetinje, Montenegro
- Konak, Croatia, a village near Vrbovec
- Konak, Targovishte Province, a village in Targovishte Province, Bulgaria

== Other uses ==
- Volkan Konak (1967–2025), Turkish folk singer
