= Josip Pankretić =

Croatian politician (1933–1998)

Josip Pankretić (15 January 1933 – 10 January 1998) was a Croatian politician. He was parliament representative and one of the leaders of Croatian Peasant Party (HSS) during the last decade of the 20th century.

His son Božidar (born 1964) is also a Croatian Peasant party politician and a Minister of Agriculture in Ivo Sanader's government.

== Sources ==
- "Josip Pankretić". vrbovec.hr (in Croatian). City of Vrbovec. Archived from the original on 7 April 2012.
