= Pirakovec =

Coordinates: 45°53′N 16°22′E

- Settlement
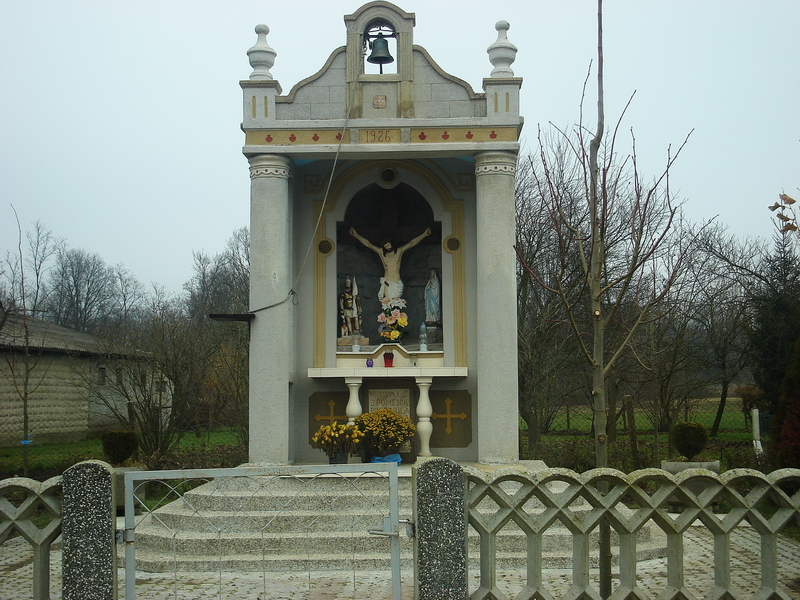

- Location within Croatia
- Country: Croatia
- County: Zagreb
- City: Vrbovec

Area
  - Total: 2.9 km^{2} (1.1 sq mi)

Population (2021)
  - Total: 149
  - Density: 51/km^{2} (130/sq mi)
- Time zone: UTC+1 (CET)
  - Summer (DST): UTC+2 (CEST)

Pirakovec is a settlement (naselje) in the Vrbovec administrative territory of Zagreb County, Croatia. As of 2011 it had a population of 170 people.
