= Brčevec =

Coordinates: 45°52′N 16°25′E

- Settlement
- Location within Croatia
- Country: Croatia
- County: Zagreb
- City: Vrbovec

Area
  - Total: 4.7 km^{2} (1.8 sq mi)

Population (2021)
  - Total: 469
  - Density: 100/km^{2} (260/sq mi)
- Time zone: UTC+1 (CET)
  - Summer (DST): UTC+2 (CEST)

Brčevec is a settlement (naselje) in the Vrbovec administrative territory of Zagreb County, Croatia. As of 2011 it had a population of 546 people.
