= Vrhovec, Zagreb County =

Coordinates: 45°54′N 16°18′E

- Settlement
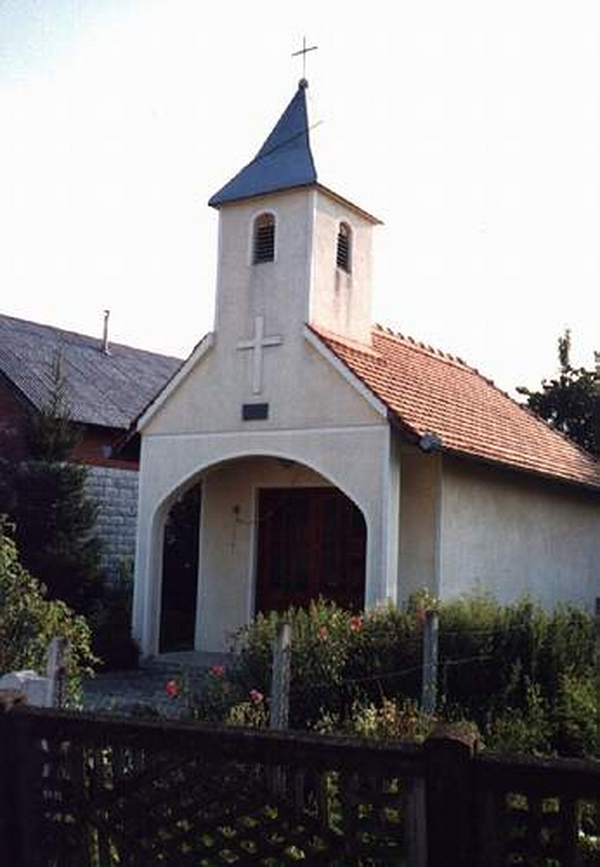
- Vrhovec - Chapel

- Location within Croatia
- Country: Croatia
- County: Zagreb
- City: Vrbovec

Area
  - Total: 1.7 km^{2} (0.66 sq mi)

Population (2021)
  - Total: 138
  - Density: 81/km^{2} (210/sq mi)
- Time zone: UTC+1 (CET)
  - Summer (DST): UTC+2 (CEST)

Vrhovec is a settlement (naselje) in the Vrbovec administrative territory of Zagreb County, Croatia. As of 2011 it had a population of 140 people.
