= Celine, Vrbovec =

- Settlement
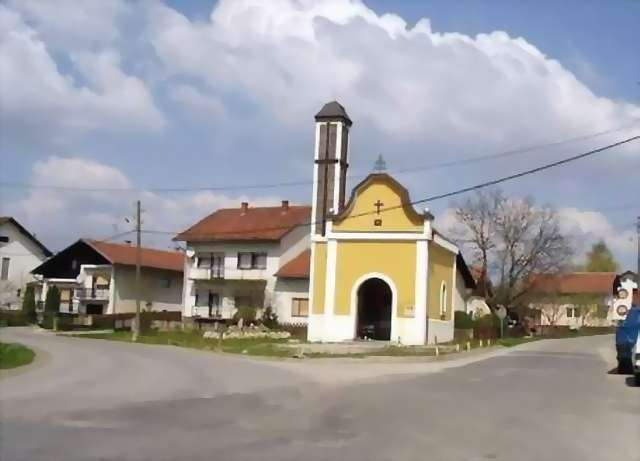
- The center of the village of Celine

- Location within Croatia
- Country: Croatia
- County: Zagreb
- City: Vrbovec

Area
  - Total: 3.2 km^{2} (1.2 sq mi)

Population (2021)
  - Total: 873
  - Density: 270/km^{2} (710/sq mi)
- Time zone: UTC+1 (CET)
  - Summer (DST): UTC+2 (CEST)

Celine, Vrbovec is a settlement (naselje) in the Vrbovec administrative territory of Zagreb County, Croatia. As of 2011 it had a population of 977 people.
