= Donji Tkalec =

- Village
- Location within Croatia
- Coordinates: 45°57′N 16°27′E
- Country: Croatia
- County: Zagreb County
- Town: Vrbovec

Area
  - Total: 4.1 km^{2} (1.6 sq mi)

Population (2021)
  - Total: 91
  - Density: 22/km^{2} (57/sq mi)
- Time zone: UTC+1 (CET)
  - Summer (DST): UTC+2 (CEST)

Donji Tkalec is a village in Croatia. It is connected by the D41 highway.
