= Hruškovica =

Coordinates: 45°56′N 16°25′E

- Settlement
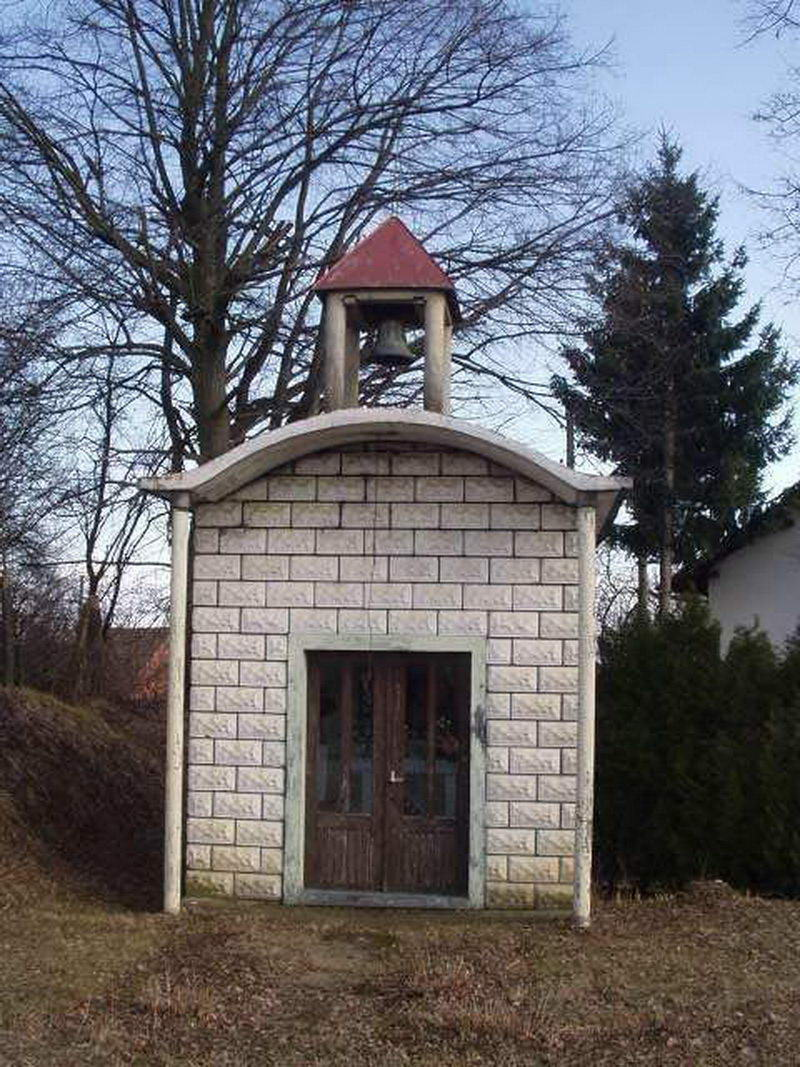
- Chapel in Hruškovica

- Location within Croatia
- Country: Croatia
- County: Zagreb
- City: Vrbovec

Area
  - Total: 2.1 km^{2} (0.81 sq mi)

Population (2021)
  - Total: 45
  - Density: 21/km^{2} (55/sq mi)
- Time zone: UTC+1 (CET)
  - Summer (DST): UTC+2 (CEST)

Hruškovica is a settlement (naselje) in the Vrbovec administrative territory of Zagreb County, Croatia. As of 2011 it had a population of 71 people.
