= Cerje, Vrbovec =

- Settlement
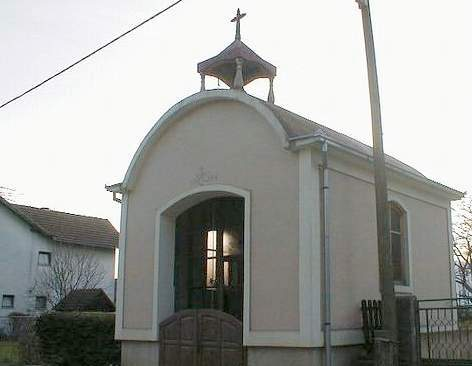
- chapel in Cerje

- Location within Croatia
- Country: Croatia
- County: Zagreb
- City: Vrbovec

Area
  - Total: 1.0 km^{2} (0.39 sq mi)

Population (2021)
  - Total: 195
  - Density: 190/km^{2} (510/sq mi)
- Time zone: UTC+1 (CET)
  - Summer (DST): UTC+2 (CEST)

Cerje, Vrbovec is a settlement (naselje) in the Vrbovec administrative territory of Zagreb County, Croatia. As of 2011 it had a population of 217 people.
