= Marija Jurić Zagorka =

Croatian author (1873–1957)

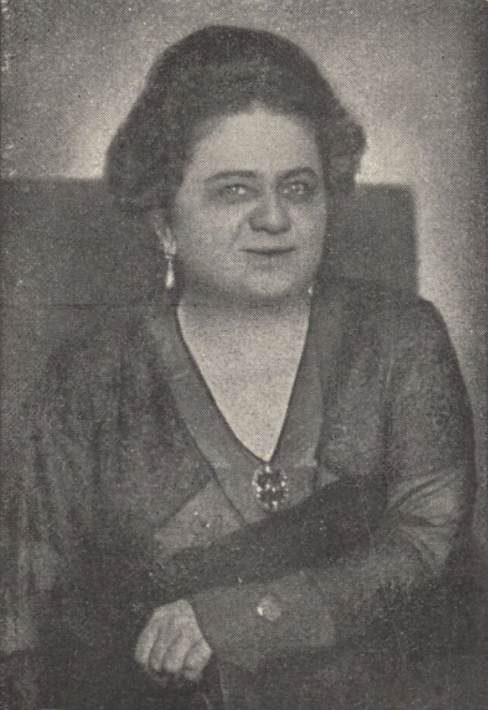
- Zagorka in 1935
- Born: 2 March 1873; Negovec, Croatia-Slavonia, Austria-Hungary
- Died: 29 November 1957 (aged 84); Zagreb, SR Croatia, SFR Yugoslavia
- Occupations: Writer, journalist
- Writing career
- Language: Croatian
- Notable work: The Witch of Grič

Marija Jurić (Croatian pronunciation: [mǎrija jǔːritɕ]; 2 March 1873 – 30 November 1957), known by her pen name Zagorka (IPA: [zǎːɡoːrka]), was a Croatian journalist, writer and women's rights activist. She was the first female journalist in Croatia and is among the most read Croatian writers.

== Early life and education ==
Marija Jurić was born on 2 March 1873 in the village of Negovec in the family of Ivan Jurić and Josipa Domin. She had two brothers and a sister. Baptized in a Catholic church on 3 March 1873, she was given the baptismal name Mariana. She later spoke of her family as being wealthy but unhappy. She spent her childhood in Hrvatsko Zagorje on the Golubovec estate owned by Baron Geza Rauch which her father managed. She was educated by private tutors alongside baron Rauch's children. Zagorka attended elementary school in Varaždin where she stood out as very intelligent and talented, finishing all grades with the highest marks. Although her father wanted to send her to Switzerland to attend high school, which baron Rauch agreed to pay, her mother objected so she eventually attended an all-girls high school at the Convent of the Sisters of Mercy in Zagreb. At her mother's insistence and with her father's objection, Zagorka married Slovak-Hungarian railway officer Andrija Matraja, 17 years her senior, in an arranged marriage held at the end of 1891. She disapproved of her husband's chauvinism against Croats. The couple lived in Szombathely for three years, during which she suffered a mental breakdown, but they eventually divorced. She learned Telegraphy and Hungarian during the time she spent in Hungary which helped her later in her career as a journalist. After dramatically escaping her abusive husband in 1895, Zagorka at first lived with her uncle in Sremska Mitrovica and afterwards in Zagreb. Matraja accused her of being mentally unstable so she was kept in an asylum for a period of time, but was eventually discharged when doctors realized that she was healthy. She managed to get a divorce with her father's help but was proclaimed guilty of marriage failure after her mother testified against her, so her former husband had no obligation to pay alimony or to return her personal belongings.

== Journalist career ==
During high school, Zagorka edited her first newspaper - Samostanske novine [Convent Newspaper]. She had a single copy that she lent to other students. In 1891, she edited the only student newspaper in Krapina - Zagorsko proljeće [Spring of Zagorje] under the pseudonym M. Jurica Zagorski (implying she was a man). Following the publication of the first issue, it was banned because of what Zagorka wrote in the introduction titled "The Spirit of Matija Gubec Accuses - Later Generations Haven't Used Spilled Blood and Are Still Slaves". In 1896, she wrote unsigned articles for the Hrvatski branik and Hrvatska Posavina newspapers.

During the same year, Zagorka started working in Obzor, first as proofreader because the board of directors and editor-in-chief Šime Mazzuro objected to her for being a woman, but after bishop Josip Juraj Strossmayer's intervention, as a journalist, although she had to sit in a separate room so no one would see her. She mostly wrote on politics, and occasionally travelogues from Zagorje, biographies, autobiographies, feuilletons, humoresques, short stories and novels in sequels. On 31 October 1896, her first article in Obzor titled Egy Percz (Hungarian for One Brief Moment) was published. In the article, Zagorka wrote about the exclusive usage of the Hungarian language - which the majority of Croats didn't understand - at the train stations in Croatia, which is why passengers didn't know where the trains were going. She later reported on political developments from the Croatian-Hungarian Parliament in Budapest and from Vienna, adding comments on politicians, and interviews and notes on unofficial political talks and general political atmosphere, which significantly contributed to the increase of Obzor's circulation. After Obzor's editor-in-chief J. Pasarić and his deputy M. Heimerl were imprisoned in 1903 during Khuen-Héderváry's strongest oppression of Croats, Zagorka edited Obzor for five months by herself. A vocal opponent of magyarization and germanization of Croatia, she was imprisoned in solitary confinement for ten days for organizing demonstrations against Khuen-Héderváry. However, her editorial work in Obzor wasn't mentioned in 1936 Obzor's Memorial Book which deeply offended her. During this time, she also wrote articles for Hungarian opposition newspapers Népszava and Magyarország. In 1910, she participated in the founding of the Croatian Journalists' Association. During the same year, she married her fellow journalist Slavko Amadej Vodvařka. They divorced in 1914.

In 1917, Zagorka left Obzor and started her own magazine - Zabavnik and also wrote articles for Jutarnji list. Afterward, she published and edited the first Croatian women's magazine Ženski list [Womans' Paper] (1925–38), personally writing most of the articles, which had a feminist and patriotic note. Zagorka also wrote articles for dozens of other prominent newspapers, including Vijenac and Novi list. She participated in the foundation of the Croatian Female Writers' Association in 1936.

In 1938, she left Ženski list dissatisfied with the majority of the editorial staff that had become supporters of conservatism and clericalism contrary to their original support for liberalism and feminism. In 1939, she founded magazine Hrvatica [Croatian Woman] (1939–41). All of the proceedings acquired from the subscribers were spent on the printing, while Zagorka volunteered. During World War II, she was persecuted by Ustaše who forbid her from publishing Hrvatica, seized all the existing magazine copies, subscription money, and even furniture from her apartment. Faced with constant harassment, she attempted suicide. In 1944, she tried to join the Yugoslav Partisans but was rejected. Following the end of the war, she became excluded from the cultural scene for which she blamed some of her former, misogynist colleagues from Obzor who believed that women should only write romance novels. Since she didn't have a pension and was therefore dependent on the help of acquaintances and readers, she decided to publish an advertisement in which she sought someone who would regularly bring her food. Among several candidates, she selected two younger men, Nikola Smolčić and Leo Car, who introduced themselves as cousins but were, in fact, a couple. She eventually asked them to move in with her. It was later revealed from the letters she secretly sent to her friends that she was heavily mistreated by Smolčić and Car. Zagorka joined the Women's Antifascist Front of Croatia, Slobodna Dalmacija purchased the copyright to her works, and in 1952, she became an independent publisher collaborating with the Otokar Keršovani Printing Office.

== Death ==
Zagorka died in Zagreb at the age of 84. She was buried on Mirogoj Cemetery by the chapel on the right side from the entrance, but not long after, her body was moved to the arcades on the left, away from the entrance.

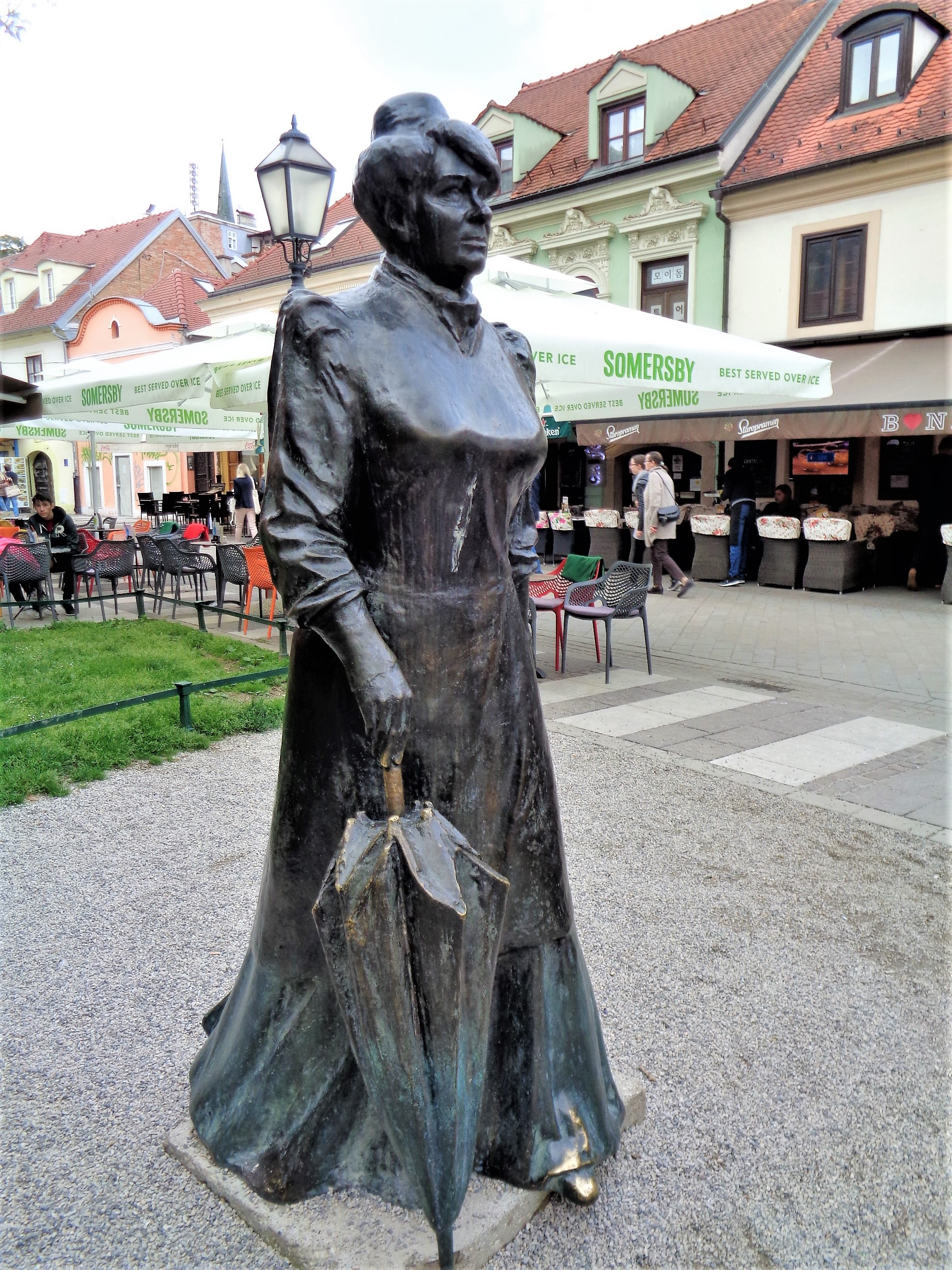
A statue of Zagorka in Zagreb, Croatia

== Legacy ==
Zagorka's property was inherited by Smolčić, who died not long after, passing the property to his partner, Car. Although Zagorka wanted her apartment on Dolac Market to be turned into a memorial center, Car did not respect her last wish, renovated the apartment and continued to live in it until his death in September 1986. In 2009, City of Zagreb bought the apartment from Car's heirs and turned it into a Memorial apartment of Marija Jurić Zagorka - operated by the educational NGO Centre for Women's Studies Zagreb - in which visitors can learn more about Zagorka and other influential women in the fields of culture, politics, science, and human rights. Every year, at the end of November, the Center organizes a cultural and scientific event entitled Days of Marija Jurić Zagorka. Every third Thursday of the month, the Center organizes public lectures on Zagorka and women's literature.

In a 2005 poll compiled by Vjesnik, a Zagreb daily newspaper, Zagorka came second in the list of most popular Croatian writers of all time. The Croatian Journalists' Association awards the annual Marija Jurić Zagorka Award for excellence in written, radio, television, online and investigative journalism. She is one of the principal subjects of the essay collection No Man's Lands: eight extraordinary women in Balkan history, by the British-Kosovan writers Elizabeth Gowing and Robert Wilton.

== Works ==
None of her novels have been translated into English, but two are available in German: The Witch of Gric (1995) and Malleus Maleficarum (1972). The latter title is the same as that of the "textbook" published in 1486 about how to find the witches, though Zagorka's novel is a fictional tale, not a witch-hunting manual. 11 of her novels, published in Croatian, are found in the Library of Congress.

=== Novels ===
- Roblje (Slaves) (1899)
- Vladko Šaretić (1903)
- Kneginja iz Petrinjske ulice (The Princess from Petrinjska Street) (1910): Zagorka's first murder mystery.
- Crveni ocean (The Red Ocean) (written under the name Jurić Vodvařka) (1918) - A utopian social novel about the 1917 October Revolution of Soviet Union. It was inspired by the inventions of Nikola Tesla.
- Tozuki (1922) - a social novel with themes from contemporary life, in which a secret society of criminals, murderers, smugglers and bribed politicians named Tozuki that arose in the first years of Yugoslavia .
- Republikanci (Republicans) (1924) deals with the Jacobin conspiracy and Napoleonic Wars and the pro-Illyrian nationalistic movement led by Croatian Ban Maksimilijan Vrhovac.
- Modri đavo (The Blue Devil) (1926)
- Plameni inkvizitori (The Flaming Inquisitors) also called Kameni križari (The Stone Crusaders) (1928). The story centres around the 13th century historical heroes "Knight Sokol" and the infamous robber Tomo Crni (Black Tomo).
- Krijeposni griješnici (The Virtuous Sinners) (1929)
- Kamen na cesti (A Stone on the Road) (1934) - An autobiographical novel detailing the author's early life. The main themes are the authors own undying patriotism in which she finds the comfort and reason to overcome all tragedies and obstacles in her life. The story starts in the authors tragic childhood filled with physical abuse from her mother and the neglect of her father. It describes a wealthy jet unhappy family, where the author herself, though being casually abused by her mother both physically and verbally, is the least mistreated child. Although told in a romanticized style, the book does a lot of psychological introspective of the narrator, analyzing both herself and others. It deals with each situation, opinion, ideal and theory by showing that things aren't how they present themselves. The center of the plot deals with her mothers decision of marrying her daughter to a 26-year older man, who eventually demands that she abandons her nationality and writes in the Hungarian spirit. The marriage ends with Mirijana refusing to abandon her nationality and becoming a "traitor", after which she elopes to her homeland Croatia, where she received the protection of her friends and father. The tragic deaths of her loved ones are the constant curse the author has to face, which gradually destroys her health and will for life. She eventually finds her cause in serving her nation, and through time gains stronger support. The novel deals with the themes of marriage, family abuse, discrimination and love, where the author concludes that her greatest love and devotion goes to her Croatian country for which she was prepared to sacrifice her wealth, good name, career offers and life, yet sees Croatia's freedom as her greatest joy and treasure.
- Vitez slavonske ravni (The Knight of the Slavonian Plain) (1938) - Set in the time of Maria Theresa. It tells the story of an impoverished noblewoman Krasanka and a masked knight who threatens the plundering bands by the use of what they see as "magic". He soon becomes a legend among the lands of Slavonia gaining nicknames such as "The Elf Knight" due to his use of pyrotechnics to frighten the superstitious bandits. It stands out as Zagorka's only literary work that's not thematically connected with Zagreb.
- Mala revolucionarka (The Little Revolutionary) (1939)
- Jadranka (1943) - Zagorka's final novel before her demise, dealing with the repression of Croatian nationalist movements under the reign of Emperor Franz Joseph I of Austria.
- Nevina u ludnici (The Innocent in the Madhouse) (1957)

=== Short Story Collection ===
Zagrebačke silhouette (The Silhouettes of Zagreb) (1911)

=== Series ===
- Grička vještica (The Witch of Grič) (1912-26) - cycle of 6 novels in 7 volumes:
1. Tajna krvavog mosta (The Secret of the Bloody Bridge) (1912)
2. Kontesa Nera (Countess Nera) (1913-14)
3. Malleus Maleficarum (1918) - The Latin title means "The Hammer of the Witches".
4. Suparnica Marije Terezije (The Rival of Maria Theresa) (1918) - 2 volumes
5. Dvorska kamarila Marije Terezije (The Court Chambers of Maria Theresa) (1926)
6. Buntovnik na prijestolju (The Rebel on the Throne) (1918)

Zagorka's most popular work, combining genres of a historical novel, romance and adventure. Set in the second half of the 18th century, it tells the story of a beautiful young Countess Nera Keglević, who was raised isolated from society by her grandmother. Famed for her beauty and open-minded conduct, she becomes the jewel of Zagrebian aristocracy, but her popularity among men causes strong discountenance among envious women who see her as a threat. Due to Nera's attempts of saving unfortunate low class women from witch-burnings, she herself gets accused of witchcraft, which opens a protest of the aristocracy against the law for condemning a member of their society. All complaints to the Queen are soon hindered by the female society, leaving Nera at the mercy of the corrupted law. She is soon saved by the infamous fiery pandur Captain Siniša, who dressed up as the Devil in order to frighten the crowd and abduct her. Eventually Empress Maria Theresa gets informed of the scandalous condemnation of her friend's granddaughter and, by the persuasion of her son Joseph, reverses the process against Nera. Nera and Siniša are soon caught by a new set of social and imperial intrigues threatening the happiness they fought so hard to obtain. The story ends with a look into the tragic life and reign of Emperor Joseph II, the "Rebel on the Throne". The first book, "Secret of the Bloody Bridge", is set in the same period but works as an independent story, unlike the later novels which are thematically tied to the story "Countess Nera". The characters from the first book appear again in the later books. Despite the greater popularity of the second story, this book is widely considered by experts to be Zagorka's best literary work. Part of the story with Maria Theresa has been inspired by the life of Magda Logomer, the last woman condemned to death for witchcraft in Zagreb. The book starts with a set of mysterious serial murders, each body found under the Bloody Bridge that connects Grič and Kaptol. The story revolves around Count Juraj Meško who is set on unmasking Baron Makar for the murder of his wife, and a poor servant girl Stanka whom her mistress dresses in the manner of a boy and presents to the society as her young nephew: Lieutenant Stanko. Meško soon grows fond of the little lieutenant and asks for his friendship and help, which Stanka accepts. The girl falls in love with the Count, risking her employment and head by the Baroness. She keeps on assisting the Count who does not recognize or return her love due to his conviction that his little friend is a boy. The story involves genres of adventure, romance, and history present in all of her novels but stands out as the only crime novel next to the Princess of Petrinjska Street.

- The Antichrist
1. Kći Lotrščaka (The Daughter of the Lotrščak) (1921-22) - A historical romance novel that deals with the 16th century nationalist uprising of the Croatian nobility against the pillaging practices of Margrave Georg von Brandenburg. The book is exceptional for reflecting on numerous old Zagrebian legends and fairy tales, presenting elements of the supernatural and religious miracles. It reflects on the famous painting of the "Madonna of the Stone Gate" which became the Holy patron of Zagreb after miraculously surviving a fire while all else, including the painting frame, burned down. The story is centered on the Grič princess Manduša, daughter of the Lotršćak, famed for her gentile kindness, religious upbringing and beauty. When a man named the "Antichrist" arrives at Grič, the clergy condemns him to be executed. After Manduša becomes a social outcast after being accused by the bishop and his mistress of being a child left on her father's doorstep, she decides to sacrifice herself by saving the Antichrist from execution by offering her hand in marriage. They are both banished from the city, at which point the story starts to unfold through the open battle of nobles with The Margrave and the Kaptolian clerics. The story deals with numerous issues such as the nature of marriage bringing up controversial questions such as the marriage of Catholic priests.
2. Kaptolski antikrist (The Antichrist of Kaptol) (1925)
- Gordana
1. Gordana (1934-35) - Zagorka's longest work, dealing with the death of Arpad King Matthias Corvinus, the struggle between Corvinus's widow Beatrice of Naples and his illegitimate son Janos for the throne, and the events leading up to the Battle of Mohács in the early 16th century. The novel tells the story of the Croatian spirit through the fictional heroine Gordana Brezovačka and her undying national pride.
  1. Proročanstvo na Kamenitim vratima (The Prophecy at the Stone Gate)
  2. Pakao prijestolja (The Hell of Thrones)
  3. Veliki sud (The Great Court)
2. Gordana Kraljica Hrvatâ (Gordana, the Queen of the Croats) (1937-39) - The sequel to Gordana.

=== Non-Fiction ===
- Poznata hrvatska spisateljica (Famous Croatian Writer) (1932) - Autobiography
- Neznana junakinja hrvatskog naroda (The Unknown Heroine of the Croatian Nation) (1939) - a study
- Što je moja krivnja (What's my Fault?) (1947)
- Memoirs (1952-53)

=== Drama ===
- Kalista i Doroteja (Callisto and Dorotheus) - written in 1887 at the age of 14, inspired by Roman history.
- Katarina Zrinska (1887 or 1888)
- Filip Košenski
- Evica Gupčeva
