= Poljanski Lug =

Coordinates: 45°50′N 16°25′E

- Settlement
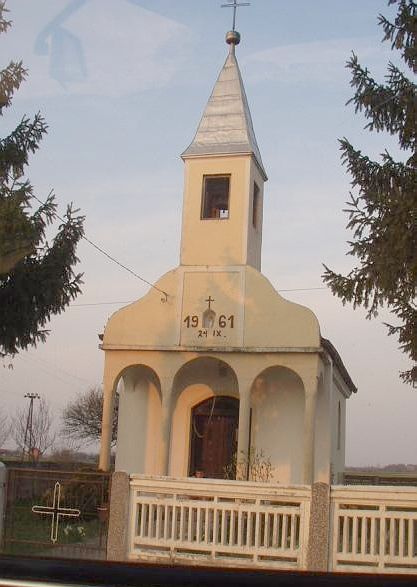
- chapel in Poljanski Lug

- Location within Croatia
- Country: Croatia
- County: Zagreb
- City: Vrbovec

Area
  - Total: 12.6 km^{2} (4.9 sq mi)

Population (2021)
  - Total: 317
  - Density: 25.2/km^{2} (65.2/sq mi)
- Time zone: UTC+1 (CET)
  - Summer (DST): UTC+2 (CEST)

Poljanski Lug is a settlement (naselje) in the Vrbovec administrative territory of Zagreb County, Croatia. As of 2011 it had a population of 425 people.
