= Lovrečka Varoš =

Coordinates: 45°55′N 16°25′E

- Settlement
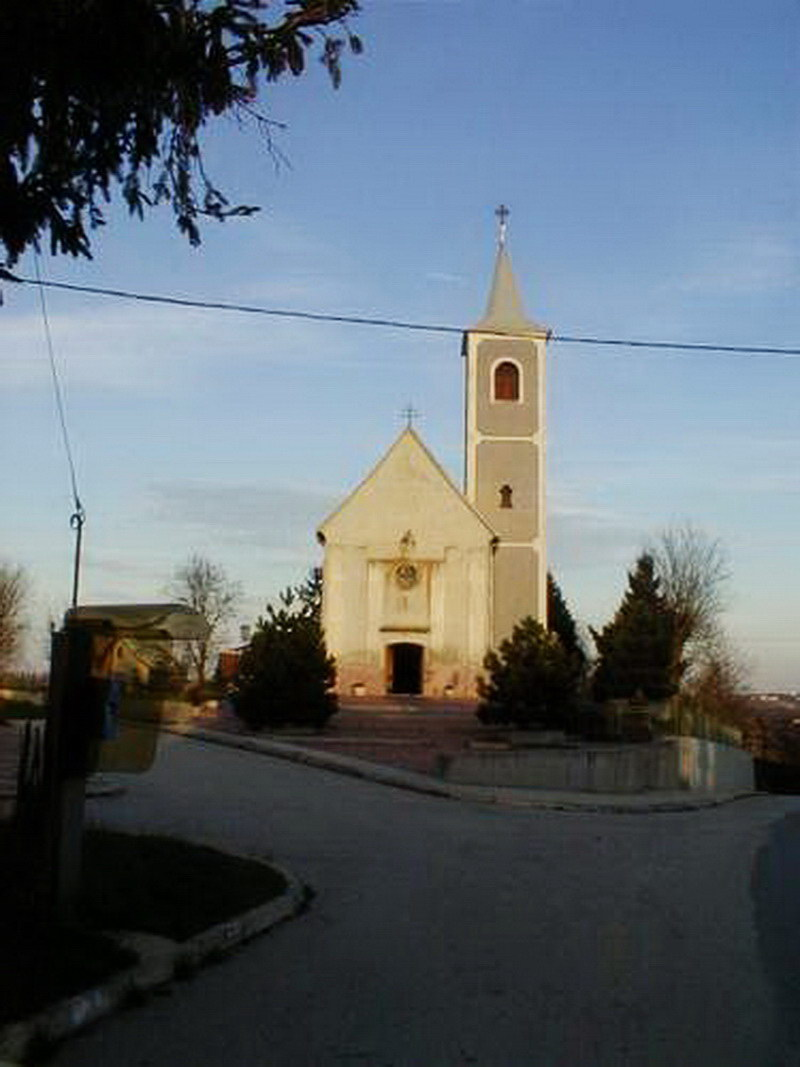
- Lovrečka Varoš - Church

- Location within Croatia
- Country: Croatia
- County: Zagreb
- City: Vrbovec

Area
  - Total: 1.6 km^{2} (0.62 sq mi)

Population (2021)
  - Total: 143
  - Density: 89/km^{2} (230/sq mi)
- Time zone: UTC+1 (CET)
  - Summer (DST): UTC+2 (CEST)

Lovrečka Varoš is a settlement (naselje) in the Vrbovec administrative territory of Zagreb County, Croatia. As of 2011 it had a population of 157 people.
