= Lovrečka Velika =

- Settlement
- Location within Croatia
- Country: Croatia
- County: Zagreb
- City: Vrbovec

Area
  - Total: 3.1 km^{2} (1.2 sq mi)

Population (2021)
  - Total: 186
  - Density: 60/km^{2} (160/sq mi)
- Time zone: UTC+1 (CET)
  - Summer (DST): UTC+2 (CEST)

Lovrečka Velika is a settlement (naselje) in the Vrbovec administrative territory of Zagreb County, Croatia. As of 2011 it had a population of 198 people.
