= Marenić =

- Settlement
- Location within Croatia
- Country: Croatia
- County: Zagreb
- City: Vrbovec

Area
  - Total: 1.9 km^{2} (0.73 sq mi)

Population (2021)
  - Total: 57
  - Density: 30/km^{2} (78/sq mi)
- Time zone: UTC+1 (CET)
  - Summer (DST): UTC+2 (CEST)

Marenić is a settlement (naselje) in the Vrbovec administrative territory of Zagreb County, Croatia. As of 2011 it had a population of 58 people.
