= Krkač =

Coordinates: 45°55′N 16°20′E

- Settlement
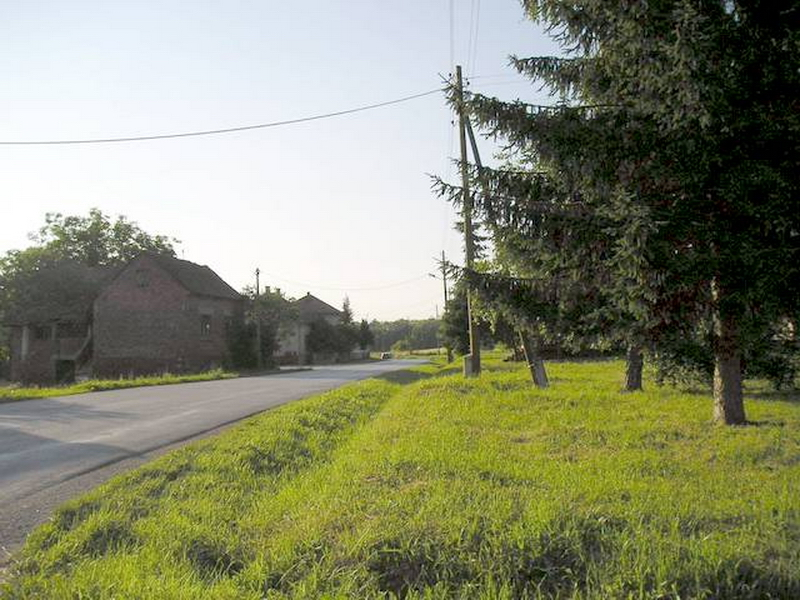
- Krkač Main Road

- Location within Croatia
- Country: Croatia
- County: Zagreb
- City: Vrbovec

Area
  - Total: 2.6 km^{2} (1.0 sq mi)

Population (2021)
  - Total: 77
  - Density: 30/km^{2} (77/sq mi)
- Time zone: UTC+1 (CET)
  - Summer (DST): UTC+2 (CEST)

Krkač is a settlement (naselje) in the Vrbovec administrative territory of Zagreb County, Croatia. As of 2011 it had a population of 89 people.
