= Savska Cesta =

- Village
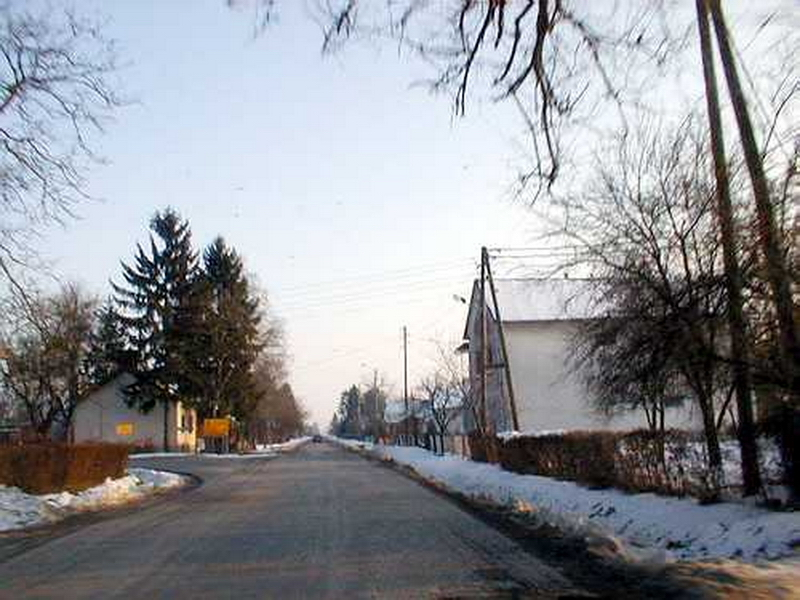
- Savska Cesta - Crossroad
- Interactive map of Savska Cesta
- Location within Croatia
- Coordinates: 45°52′15″N 16°25′20″E
- Country: Croatia
- County: Zagreb County
- Municipality: Vrbovec

Area
  - Total: 0.3 km^{2} (0.12 sq mi)

Population (2021)
  - Total: 152
  - Density: 510/km^{2} (1,300/sq mi)
- Time zone: UTC+1 (CET)
  - Summer (DST): UTC+2 (CEST)

Savska Cesta is a village in Croatia.
