= Radici =

Radici may refer to:

- Radici (album), a 1972 album by Francesco Guccini
- Radići, Bosnia and Herzegovina, a village near Goražde
- Radići, Istria County, a village near Sveti Lovreč, Croatia
- Radići, Primorje-Gorski Kotar County, a village near Malinska-Dubašnica, Croatia
- Radici Group, an Italian corporation specialized in chemical production of polyamide polymers, synthetic fibres and nonwovens

== People with the surname ==
- Fausto Radici (1953–2002), Italian alpine skier
- Luigi Induini Radici (1929-1972), Italian actor

== See also ==
- Radice
