= Negovec =

Coordinates: 45°53′N 16°19′E

- Settlement
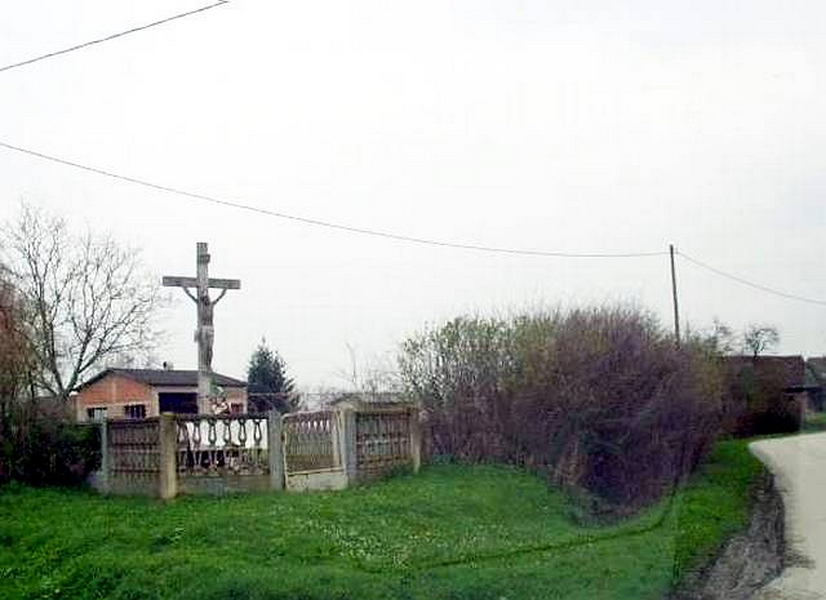
- Negovec

- Location within Croatia
- Country: Croatia
- County: Zagreb
- City: Vrbovec

Area
  - Total: 7.1 km^{2} (2.7 sq mi)

Population (2021)
  - Total: 154
  - Density: 22/km^{2} (56/sq mi)
- Time zone: UTC+1 (CET)
  - Summer (DST): UTC+2 (CEST)

Negovec is a settlement (naselje) in the Vrbovec administrative territory of Zagreb County, Croatia. As of 2011 it had a population of 176 people.
