= Vrbovec =

- Town
- Grad Vrbovec; Town of Vrbovec
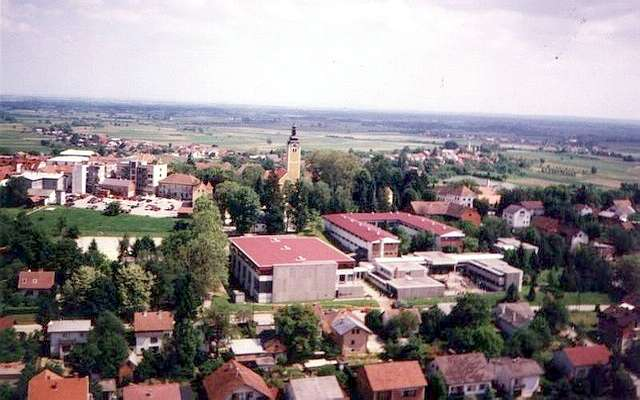
- Vrbovec Town, 2006
- Interactive map of Vrbovec
- Location of Vrbovec in Croatia
- Coordinates: 45°53′N 16°26′E
- Country: Croatia
- Region: Central Croatia (Prigorje)
- County: Zagreb County

Government
  - Mayor: Denis Kralj (SDP)

Area
  - Town: 160.9 km^{2} (62.1 sq mi)
  - Urban: 10.4 km^{2} (4.0 sq mi)
- Highest elevation: 125 m (410 ft)

Population (2021)
  - Town: 12,981
  - Density: 80.68/km^{2} (209.0/sq mi)
  - Urban: 4,551
  - Urban density: 438/km^{2} (1,130/sq mi)
- Time zone: UTC+1 (CET)
  - Summer (DST): UTC+2 (CEST)
- Postal code: 10340
- Area code: 01
- Vehicle registration: ZG
- Website: vrbovec.hr

Vrbovec (Croatian pronunciation: [ʋr̂boʋet͡s]) is a town in Zagreb County, Croatia, lying to the northeast of the capital Zagreb.

== Geography ==
The town of Vrbovec lies to the north-east of Zagreb, either 32 km (20 mi) along the A4 motorway and the D10 expressway or 40 km (25 mi) by the old Zagreb – Dugo Selo – Bjelovar road, and by train on the direction M201 railway (Botovo – Dugo Selo).

== Population ==
In the 2011 Croatian census, the total population of the administrative territory of Vrbovec was 14,797; in the 2021 Croatian census it was 13,052, in the following settlements:

- Banovo, population 111 (113 in 2011)
- Brčevec, population 476 (546 in 2011)
- Celine, population 822 (977 in 2011)
- Cerik, population 39 (48 in 2011)
- Cerje, population 197 (217 in 2011)
- Dijaneš, population 159 (167 in 2011)
- Đivan, population 29 (32 in 2011)
- Donji Tkalec, population 91 (97 in 2011)
- Dulepska, population 135 (155 in 2011)
- Gaj, population 323 (381 in 2011)
- Gornji Tkalec, population 128 (185 in 2011)
- Gostović, population 119 (139 in 2011)
- Graberanec, population 1 (0 in 2011)
- Graberšćak, population 44 (87 in 2011)
- Greda, population 104 (96 in 2011)
- Hruškovica, population 45 (71 in 2011)
- Konak, population 112 (115 in 2011)
- Krkač, population 79 (89 in 2011)
- Kućari, population 43 (92 in 2011)
- Lonjica, population 823 (1,020 in 2011)
- Lovrečka Varoš, population 143 (157 in 2011)
- Lovrečka Velika, population 189 (198 in 2011)
- Luka, population 740 (840 in 2011)
- Lukovo, population 150 (184 in 2011)
- Marenić, population 57 (58 in 2011)
- Martinska Ves, population 454 (506 in 2011)
- Naselje Stjepana Radića, population 225 (246 in 2011)
- Negovec, population 155 (176 in 2011)
- Novo Selo, population 85 (123 in 2011)
- Peskovec, population 278 (323 in 2011)
- Pirakovec, population 145 (170 in 2011)
- Podolec, population 71 (96 in 2011)
- Poljana, population 316 (423 in 2011)
- Poljanski Lug, population 332 (425 in 2011)
- Prilesje, population 149 (181 in 2011)
- Samoborec, population 102 (117 in 2011)
- Savska Cesta, population 159 (162 in 2011)
- Topolovec, population 129 (133 in 2011)
- Vrbovec, population 4,581 (4,947 in 2011)
- Vrbovečki Pavlovec, population 402 (398 in 2011)
- Vrhovec, population 138 (140 in 2011)
- Žunci, population 125 (167 in 2011)

In 2011, 97.66% of the population were Croats.

Town of Vrbovec: Population trends 1857–2021
v

population	6143	6523	6892	8526	9912	11723	11769	12225	12698	12881	12694	12176	12938	13303	14658	14797	12981
	1857	1869	1880	1890	1900	1910	1921	1931	1948	1953	1961	1971	1981	1991	2001	2011	2021

Sources: Croatian Bureau of Statistics publications

== Administration ==
Town government, court, police, health and postal services are the part of infrastructure of Vrbovec. From 2001 to 2005 the mayor was Zlatko Herček (HSS). He was succeeded by Vladimir Bregović (HDZ) in 2005. After 12 years in office Mayor Bregović was succeeded in 2017 by Denis Kralj (SDP). Kralj won the highest number of votes in the second round elections since the introduction of direct elections for mayor in Vrbovec.

== History ==
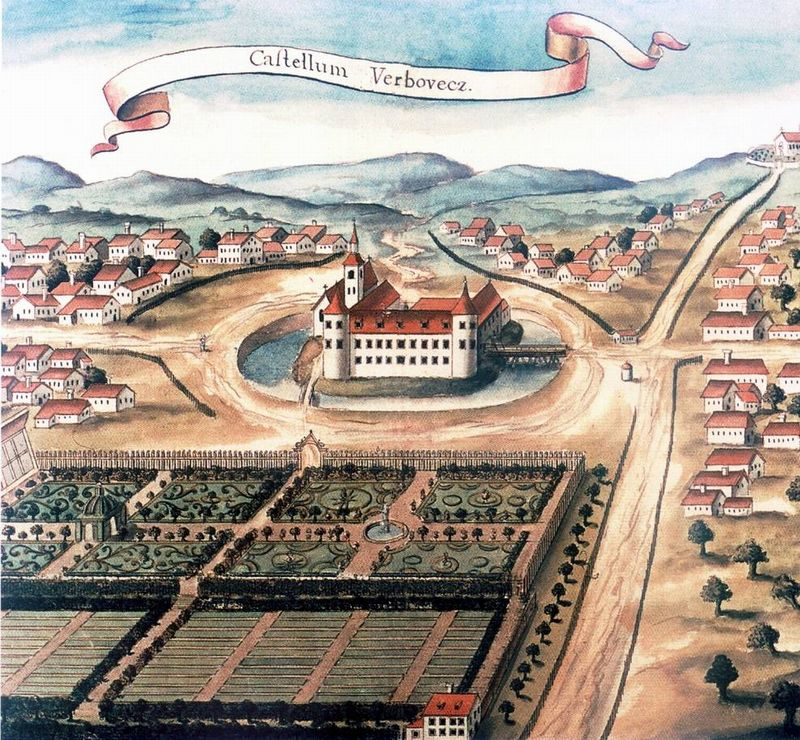
Vrbovec in 1740

Vrbovec was first mentioned in written documents dated April 21, 1244. The document today lies in the Archbishop's archive in Zagreb, in serial Privilegialia. It was published by Croatian-Hungarian King Bela III (IV), where feudal field was given to the countman Junk, the son of Izak from Ravno (village), whose right are confirmed from the Koloman (brother of King Bela). The countman Junk was the higher officer at Križevci's county.

A mid-air airplane collision occurred near Vrbovec on September 10, 1976.

The DVD "PIK Vrbovec" was founded in 1948.

== Economy ==
The main industries in Vrbovec are the production of meat and meat products. The most important local employer is Meat Industry PIK Vrbovec, which employs 1,600 people. As a part of the conglomeration ForteNova group, it has become a very important producer of meat in Croatia. Other companies are PosPlast, Bravel, Oprema-group, smaller companies which are growing at the old industrial zone, as followers of ex-companies such were it: Šavrić/Pevex, Gradip (brick makers), and Oprema. There is the society of small Private entrepreneurs of Vrbovec, too. Their production are mostly for parts for different European's industries.

A large co-operation around Vrbovec at the agriculture fields are continuing to exist in the modern times, despite the depopulation of the local villages and less interest of young people for the work in fields.

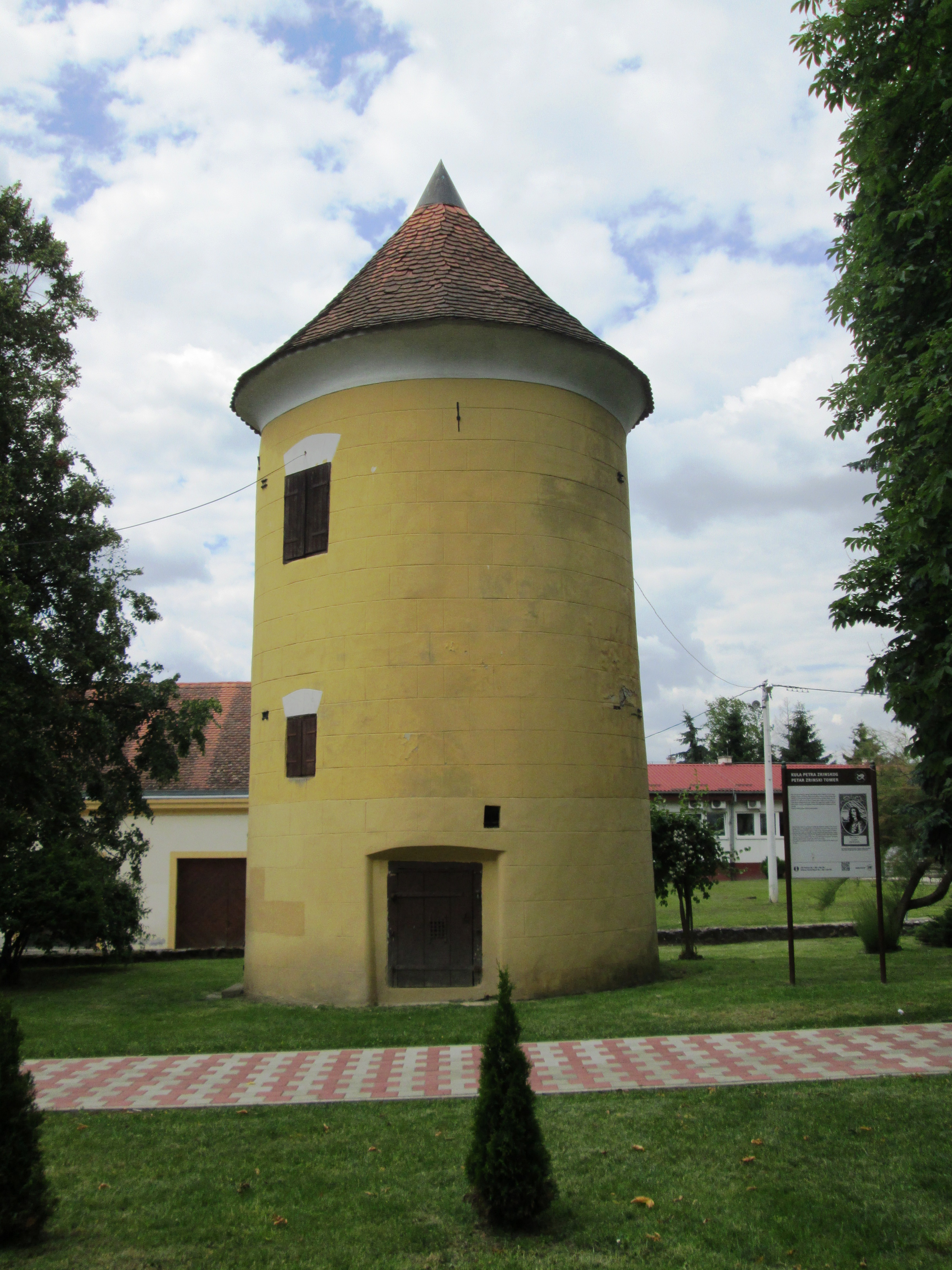
Tower of Petar Zrinski

== Sights ==
Notable buildings in Vrbovec include the Mausoleum of family De Piennes in the local cemetery. the Tower of Petar Zrinski in Vrbovec, the castle of Patačić in Vrbovec, the castle of Lovrečina Grad, and the church of Saint Vitus in Vrbovec.

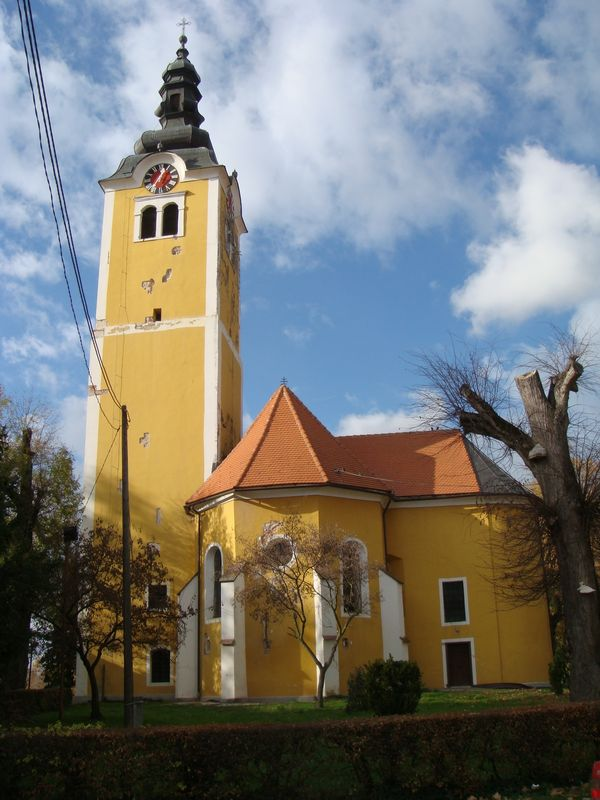
Church of Saint Vitus, 15th to 19th century

== Education ==
The first elementary school was founded in 1669. Today Vrbovec has two elementary schools named 1st. and 2nd. Vrbovec school, and one high-school, which includes large choice of education from classical gymnasium to the industrial orientation.

In Vrbovec is active Pučko Otvoreno Učilište (public open college), where additional education is possible to be obtained. Different courses helps to the local community in change of own wishes for the knowledge.

The university doesn't exist in Vrbovec, mostly students are going naturally to Zagreb. Reach by train or bus, its half-to-one-hour travel to the University in Zagreb.

== Culture ==
Vrbovec has got a local small cinema, culture-art society HKUD "Petar Zrinski", a library, a radio station Vrbovec, and the people's university of Vrbovec. There is no local TV station, theatre (opera) or university. People travel to Zagreb as the centre of these activities.

"Kaj su jeli naši stari" is the main traditional annual event in Vrbovec. Usually, last week-end of August, this manifestation is a chance to see whole town at one place.

Another important date is June 15, the town day, and the celebration of Saint Vitus, the protector of Vrbovec.

Vrbovečka udruga mladih is an organisation very popular among the younger people of Vrbovec.

== Sport ==
The local football club is NK Vrbovec, of the Croatian Third League. There is also the KK Petar Zrinski basketball club and the HK Vrbovec wrestling club.

== Notable people ==
- Petar Zrinski, Ban of Croatia and writer
- Marija Jurić Zagorka, first female journalist in Croatia and writer, born in Negovec
- Josip Pankretić, parliamentarian
- Leona Paraminski, actress

== Twin towns – sister cities ==
Vrbovec is twinned with:

- Kispest (Budapest), Hungary
- Périers, France
