= Prilesje, Zagreb County =

Prilesje
- Settlement
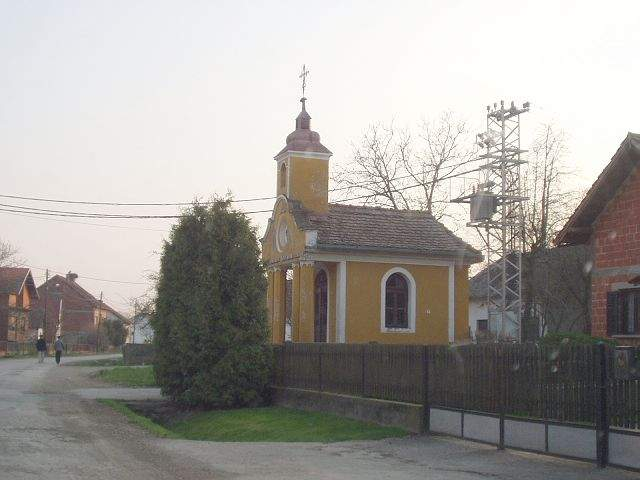
- Chapel at the center of the village of Prilesja
- Interactive map of Prilesje
- Location within Croatia
- Coordinates: 45°51′N 16°25′E
- Country: Croatia
- County: Zagreb
- City: Vrbovec

Area
  - Total: 2.2 km^{2} (0.85 sq mi)

Population (2021)
  - Total: 149
  - Density: 68/km^{2} (180/sq mi)
- Time zone: UTC+1 (CET)
  - Summer (DST): UTC+2 (CEST)

Prilesje is a settlement (naselje) in the Vrbovec administrative territory of Zagreb County, Croatia. As of 2011 it had a population of 181 people.
