= Martinska Ves, Zagreb County =

Martinska Ves
- Village
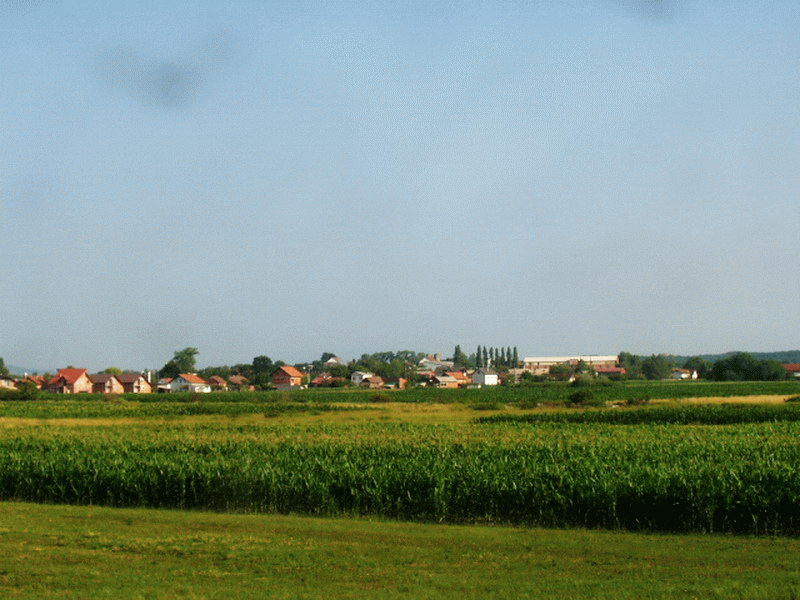
- Martinska Ves panorama

- Location within Croatia
- Coordinates: 45.881748°N 16.399477°E
- Country: Croatia
- County: Zagreb County
- Municipality: Vrbovec

Area
  - Total: 1.8 km^{2} (0.69 sq mi)

Population (2021)
  - Total: 451
  - Density: 250/km^{2} (650/sq mi)
- Time zone: UTC+1 (CET)
  - Summer (DST): UTC+2 (CEST)

Martinska Ves is a village in Croatia. It is part of Vrbovec, connected by the D41 highway.
