= D12 road (Croatia) =

Road in Croatia

The D12 (Croatian: Državna cesta 12) is a partially built state road in central Croatia, intended to connect the Vrbovec 2 interchange (with D10) with Bjelovar, Virovitica, and the border crossing Terezino Polje (with Hungary), with a planned length of 86.5 kilometres (53.7 mi).

The road was planned to be upgraded to the A13 motorway (Croatian: Autocesta A13), a motorway forming the eastern arm of the Podravina Y corridor, branching northeast from Vrbovec toward Bjelovar and Virovitica. Construction of the motorway was cancelled by the Government of Croatia in June 2012 after funding was never secured, following criticism that the project had been announced as a pre-election measure. The first section of the expressway, between the Vrbovec 2 interchange and Farkaševac, was opened in April 2019.

== Planned upgrade to motorway ==
A13 motorway
- Autocesta A13
- Podravski ipsilon
- planned other motorways

Route information
- Length: 0 km (0 mi; 0 ft) planned 86.5 km (53.7 mi)

Major junctions
- From: A12 in Vrbovec 2 interchange

Location
- Country: Croatia
- Counties: Zagreb County

Highway system
- Highways in Croatia

The A13 motorway (Croatian: Autocesta A13) was a planned motorway, expected to be built in the central Croatia northeast from Vrbovec, extending towards the cities of Bjelovar and Virovitica. As of May 2012, only the Vrbovec 2 interchange, the starting (western) terminus of the A13 has been completed. The route was planned to be built as a six lane motorway and extended northeast to Bjelovar, Virovitica and Terezino Polje border crossing to Hungary.

The A13 motorway represented the eastern arm of the so-called Podravina Y, as the western arm is the partially constructed A12 motorway. The A13 was planned to branch off from the A12 at the Vrbovec 2 interchange, which is largely completed, although it may not be used by motorists driving on the A12 as that exit is currently blocked. Construction of the motorway was cancelled in June 2012.

== Planned construction ==
The A13 motorway, 86.0 km (53.4 mi) long overall, was initially planned to comprise four sections: 27.5-kilometre (17.1 mi) Vrbovec 2 – Bjelovar, 13.7-kilometre (8.5 mi) Bjelovar – Bedenik, 30.8-kilometre (19.1 mi) Bedenik – Virovitica and 25.0-kilometre (15.5 mi) Virovitica – Terezino Polje sections.

The first construction stage was scheduled to include the section between the existing Vrbovec 2 interchange and Bjelovar, where the motorway would default to the D43 state road. Four interchanges, apart from the Vrbovec 2, were planned on that section: Kapela and Farkaševac interchanges to the Ž3041 (to Haganj) and Ž2231 (to Kenđelovec and Farkaševac) county roads respectively, Gudovac to the D28 state road to the western parts of Bjelovar and Bjelovar interchange to the D43 state road and the northern and the eastern parts of the city. The works related to the first part of the route were officially announced in 2009, however no construction took place for more than a year, causing delay of planned completion of the motorway until 2013.

On 16 April 2019 the first part between the Vrbovec 2 interchange and Farkaševac was opened.

=== Criticism and cancellation ===
The A13 had been formally announced in May 2009, but actual project planning, issuing of permits and construction works were delayed and postponed to an undetermined date, drawing criticism of the project as a pre-election stunt for the local elections of 2009. On 2 May 2012, management of Hrvatske autoceste announced cancellation of construction of the motorway, pending approval of its supervisory board. The company reported that funding was never secured for construction of the route, while declining to comment on possible payment of damages to contractors. By May 2012, Strabag, a motorway contractor, demanded 30 million kuna (c. 4 million euro) in damages because of delay of construction, but the request was declined by Hrvatske autoceste citing failure of Strabag to fulfill its contractual obligations. On 20 June 2012, the Government of Croatia cancelled construction of the motorway.

== Exit list ==
County	km	Exit	Name	Destination	Notes
Zagreb County	0.0	1	Vrbovec 2	D10	Connection to the D10. The western terminus of the expressway.
Zagreb County	10.6	2	Farkaševac	D544	Connection to Kenđelovec and Farkaševac.
Bjelovar-Bilogora		Parking area traffic sign	Proposed/unopened. Bjelovar rest area.		
Bjelovar-Bilogora		3	Gudovac		Proposed/unopened. Connection to planned Veliko Korenovo business zone.
Bjelovar-Bilogora	27.5	4	Bjelovar	D43	Proposed/unopened. Connection to Bjelovar. The eastern terminus of the first section of the A13.
Bjelovar-Bilogora		5	Bulinac	D28	Proposed/unopened. Connection to Bulinac and Nova Rača.
Bjelovar-Bilogora		Parking area traffic sign	Proposed/unopened. Bedenik rest area.		
Bjelovar-Bilogora		6	Velika Pisanica		Proposed/unopened. Connection to Velika Pisanica.
Virovitica-Podravina		Parking area traffic sign	Proposed/unopened. Bilogora rest area.		
Virovitica-Podravina		7	Špišić Bukovica		Proposed/unopened. Connection to Špišić Bukovica.
Virovitica-Podravina	73.0	8	Virovitica	D2 D5 E661	Proposed/unopened. Connection to Virovitica. The eastern terminus of the expressway.
Virovitica-Podravina	1.000 mi = 1.609 km; 1.000 km = 0.621 mi: Unopened				
