= Vrbovečki Pavlovec =

- Village
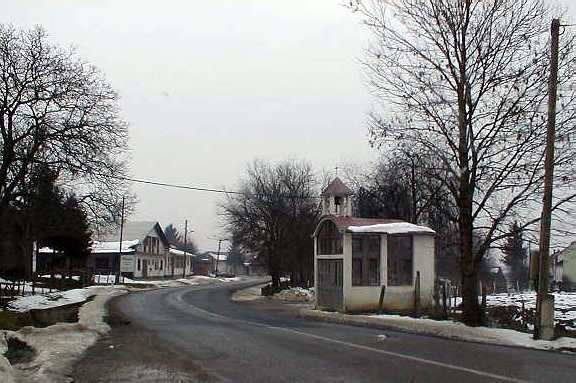
- Center of Vrbovečki Pavlovec

- Location within Croatia
- Coordinates: 45°54′22″N 16°25′52″E
- Country: Croatia
- County: Zagreb County

Area
  - Total: 2.7 km^{2} (1.0 sq mi)

Population (2021)
  - Total: 402
  - Density: 150/km^{2} (390/sq mi)
- Time zone: UTC+1 (CET)
  - Summer (DST): UTC+2 (CEST)

Vrbovečki Pavlovec is a village in Croatia. It is connected by the D41 highway.
