= Konak, Croatia =

- Settlement
- Country: Croatia
- County: Zagreb
- City: Vrbovec

Population (2011)
  - Total: 115
- Time zone: UTC+1 (CET)
  - Summer (DST): UTC+2 (CEST)

Konak, Croatia is a settlement (naselje) in the Vrbovec administrative territory of Zagreb County, Croatia. As of 2011 it had a population of 115 people.
