= Sveta Helena, Zagreb County =

Sveta Helena
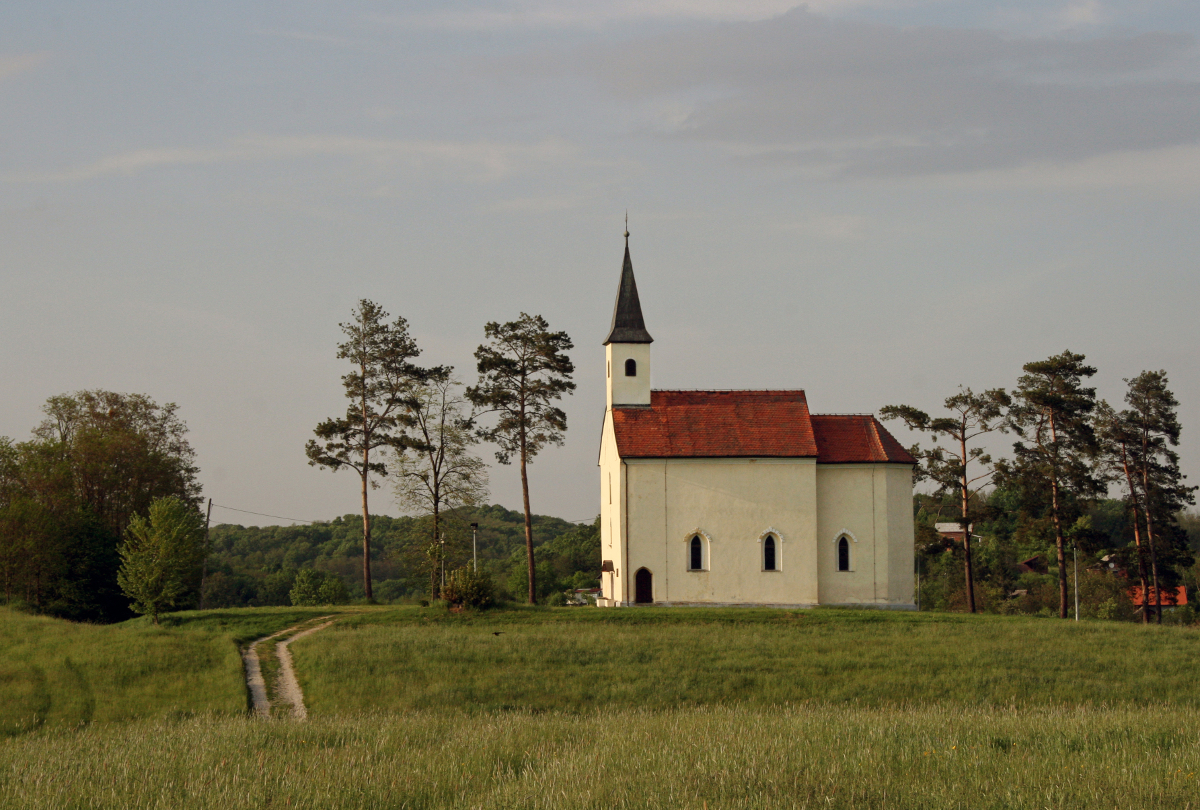
- St. Helen's church in Sveta Helena

- Location within Croatia
- Coordinates: 45°54′24″N 16°15′20″E
- Country: Croatia
- County: Zagreb County
- City: Sveti Ivan Zelina

Area
  - Total: 6.2 km^{2} (2.4 sq mi)

Population (2021)
  - Total: 353
  - Density: 57/km^{2} (150/sq mi)
- Time zone: UTC+1 (CET)
  - Summer (DST): UTC+2 (CEST)

Sveta Helena (often abbreviated Sv. Helena) is a naselje (settlement) in the town of Sveti Ivan Zelina in Zagreb County, Croatia, population 366 (2011 census). It is best known for the highway interchange of A4 highway and D10 expressway it houses. A highway node where in December 2008 Outlet center Sveta Helena was open and after two years shut down.

== History ==
The Viennese architect Gerok signed designed the reconstruction and enlargement of the Adamovich-Hellenbach-Milšić manor in Sveta Helena. The manor features decorative towers. In the 19th century, it was given a Neo-gothic facade.
