= Luka, Vrbovec =

- Settlement
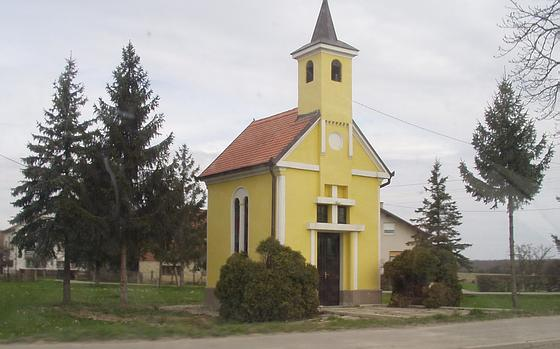
- chapel in Luka

- Location within Croatia
- Country: Croatia
- County: Zagreb
- City: Vrbovec

Area
  - Total: 12.4 km^{2} (4.8 sq mi)

Population (2021)
  - Total: 737
  - Density: 59.4/km^{2} (154/sq mi)
- Time zone: UTC+1 (CET)
  - Summer (DST): UTC+2 (CEST)

Luka, Vrbovec is a settlement (naselje) in the Vrbovec administrative territory of Zagreb County, Croatia. As of 2011 it had a population of 840 people.
