= Gaj, Zagreb County =

Gaj
- Village
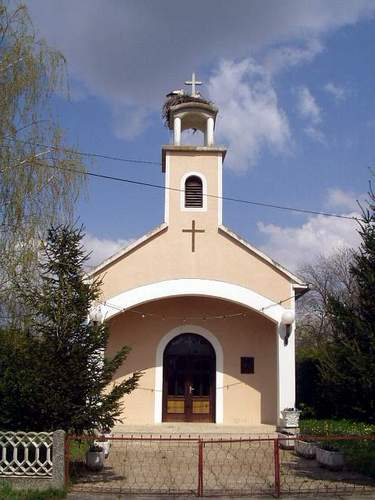
- Gaj
- Interactive map of Gaj
- Location within Croatia
- Coordinates: 45°53′46″N 16°22′12″E
- Country: Croatia
- County: Zagreb County
- Municipality: Vrbovec

Area
  - Total: 6.4 km^{2} (2.5 sq mi)

Population (2021)
  - Total: 326
  - Density: 51/km^{2} (130/sq mi)
- Time zone: UTC+1 (CET)
  - Summer (DST): UTC+2 (CEST)

Gaj is a village in the municipality of Vrbovec in Zagreb County, Croatia.
