= D26 road (Croatia) =

State road in Croatia

D26 state road

Route information
- Length: 88.5 km (55.0 mi)

Major junctions
- From: D10 in Dubrava interchange
- D43 in Čazma; D45 in Garešnica
- To: D5 in Daruvar

Location
- Country: Croatia
- Counties: Zagreb County, Bjelovar-Bilogora
- Major cities: Vrbovec, Čazma, Garešnica, Daruvar.

Highway system
- Highways in Croatia

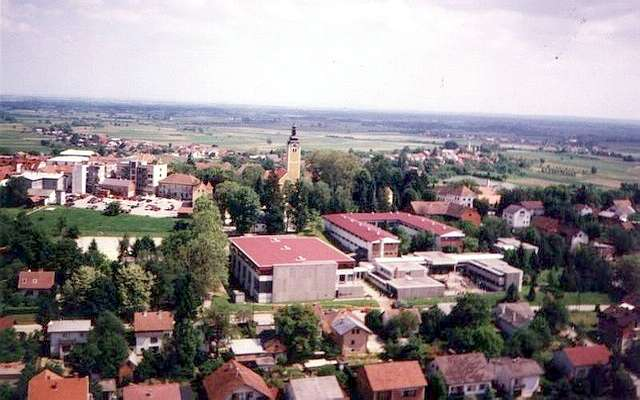
Vrbovec, near the western terminus of the D26 road

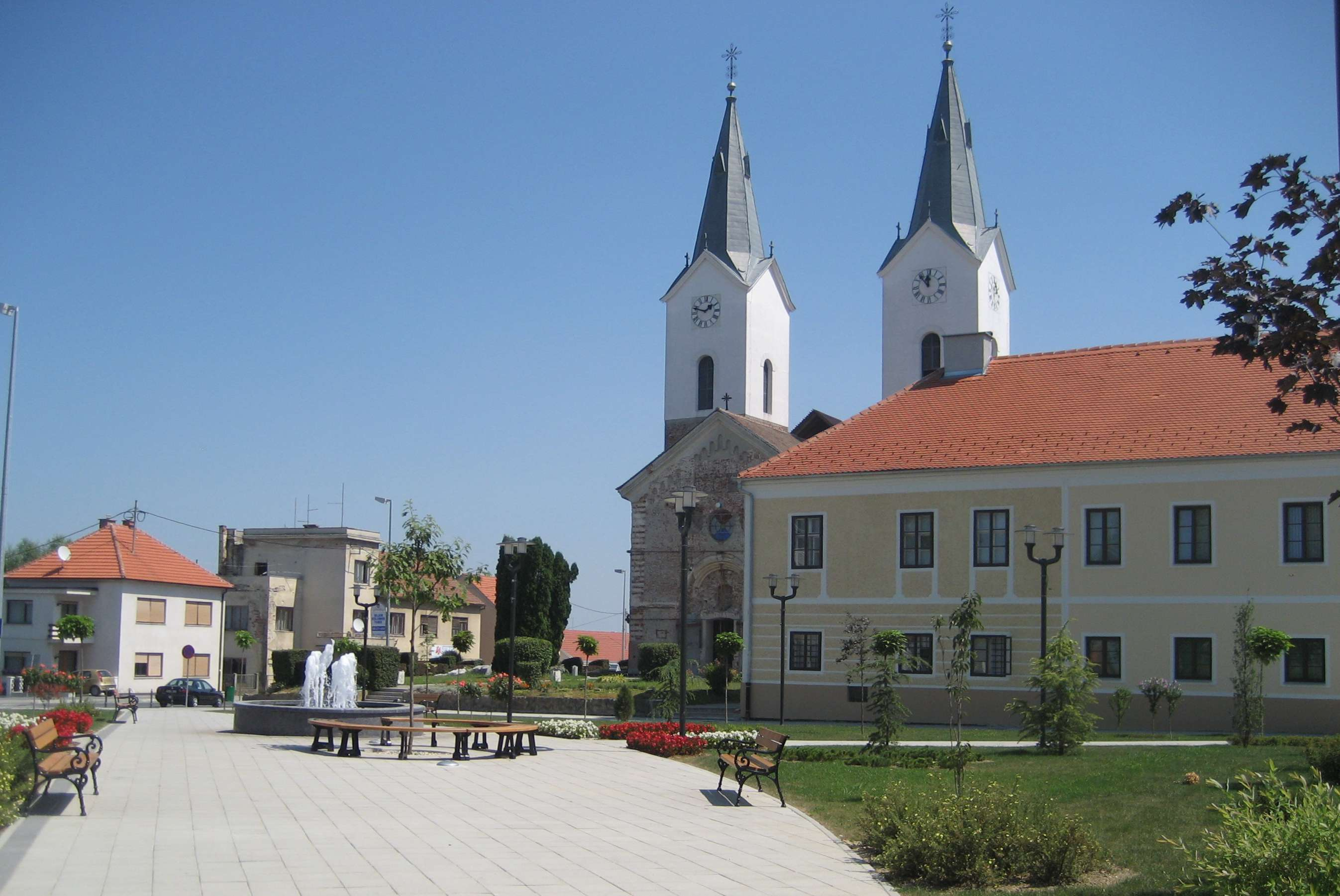
Čazma, on the D26 road route

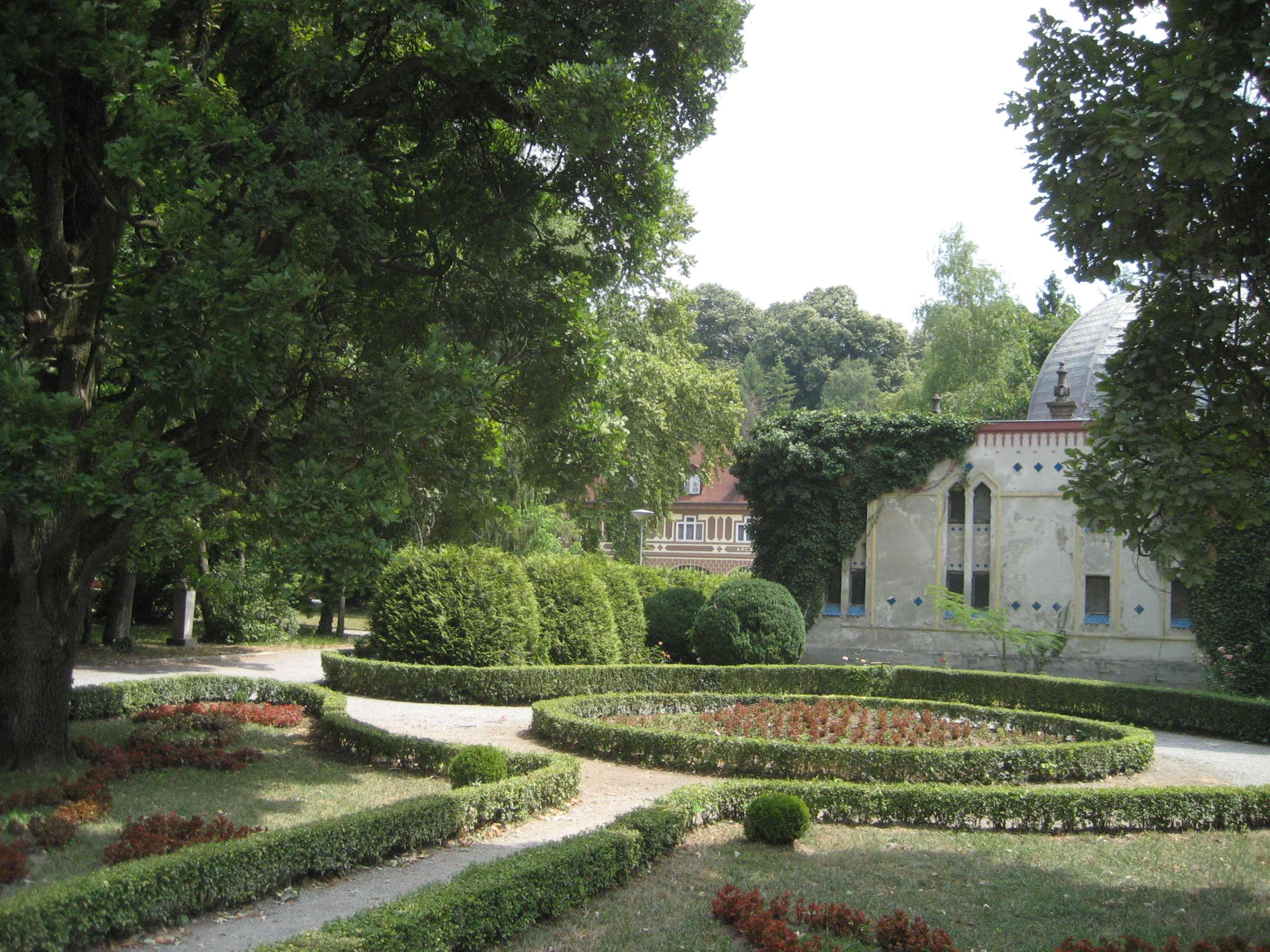
Daruvar, at the eastern terminus of the D26 road

D26 is a state road in central Croatia connecting the D5 in Daruvar and the D10 expressway near Vrbovec (Dubrava interchange), comprising a connection to the planned but cancelled A12 motorway route. The road is 88.5 km (55.0 mi) long.

The road, as well as all other state roads in Croatia, is managed and maintained by Hrvatske ceste, a state owned company.

== Traffic volume ==
Traffic is regularly counted and reported by Hrvatske ceste, operator of the road.

D26 traffic volume
Road	Counting site	AADT	ASDT	Notes
D26	2036 Konak	2,409	2,444	Adjacent to the Dubrava interchange (D10).
D26	2111 Čazma - east	1,524	1,625	Adjacent to the L37056 junction.
D26	2112 Trnovitički Popovac	1,231	1,298	Adjacent to the D45 junction.
D26	2128 Garešnica	5,155	5,168	Between the Ž3165 and D45 junctions.
D26	2211 Hrastovac	1,302	1,393	Adjacent to the Ž3168 junction.
D26	2218 Uljanik	1,140	1,196	Adjacent to the L37145 junction.

== Road junctions and populated areas ==
D26 junctions/populated areas
Type	Slip roads/Notes
	Dubrava interchange D10 expressway to the A4 motorway Sveta Helena interchange (to the west) and to Križevci (D22) (to the north). Ž3288 to Vrbovec, Rakovec and Sveti Ivan Zelina (D3). The western terminus of the road.
	Koritna
	Ladina
	Dubrava; Ž2211 to Cugovec, Poljana Križevačka and Cubinec (D22). Ž3401 to Ivanić Grad (to the south) and to Haganj (D28) (to the north).
	Zgališće
	Bađinec
	Svinjarec
	Donji Dragičevci
	Cerina; Ž3284 to Donji Lipovčani, Marčani and Sovari (D43).
	Čazma; D43 to the A3 motorway Ivanić Grad interchange (to the south) and to Bjelovar and Đurđevac (D2) (to the north). Ž3128 to Rečica Kriška.
	Grabovnica
	Vučani
	Donji Miklouš; Ž3082 to Martinac and Donja Šušnjara.
	Šimljanik
	Gornja Garešnica; Ž3131 to Gornja Jelenska and Pobrđe.
	Trnovitički Popovac
	Ž3084 to Begovača, Berek, Ivanska and Paljevine.
	Mali Pašijan
	Veliki Pašijan; Ž3090 to Velika Trnovitica and Nova Rača.
	D45 to Veliki Zdenci (D5) (to the north). The D26 and D45 are concurrent to the south.
	Garešnica; D45 to the A3 motorway Kutina interchange (to the south). The D26 and D45 are concurrent to the north. Ž3136 to Tomašica and Veliki Zdenci (D5). Ž3167 to Kaniška Iva and Međurić. Ž3165 to Dišnik.
	Hrastovac
	Uljanik; Ž3168 to Poljana, Međurić and Banova Jaruga.
	Blagorodovac
	Dežanovac; Ž3138 to Končanica (D5). Ž3169 to Trojeglava and Badljevina (D5). Ž3281 to Kreštelovac and Sokolovac.
	Ivanovo Polje
	Gornji Daruvar
	Daruvar; D5 to Pakrac and the A3 motorway Okučani interchange (to the south) and to Veliki Zdenci and Virovitica (D2). Ž3287 within the city. The eastern terminus of the road.
