= D45 road (Croatia) =

Road in Croatia

D45 state road

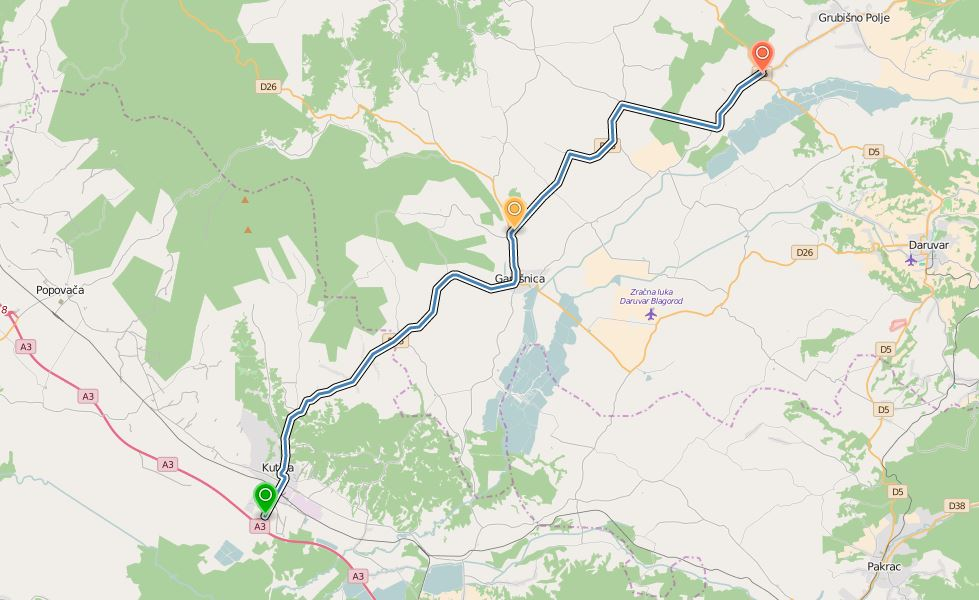

Route information
- Length: 43.6 km (27.1 mi)

Major junctions
- From: D5 and D28 in Veliki Zdenci
- D26 in Garešnica
- To: A3 in Kutina interchange

Location
- Country: Croatia
- Counties: Bjelovar-Bilogora, Sisak-Moslavina
- Major cities: Garešnica, Kutina

Highway system
- Highways in Croatia

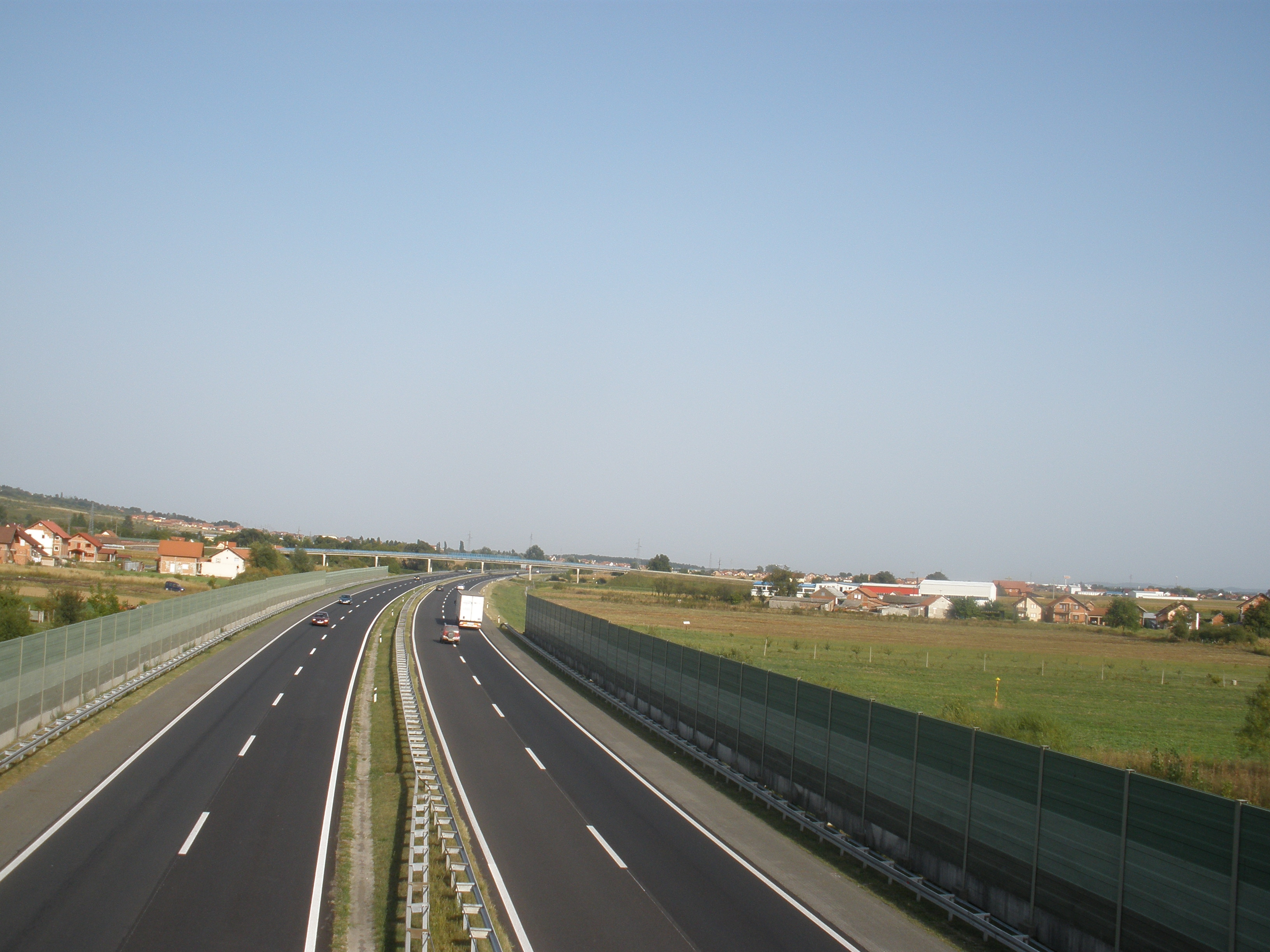
The D45 road terminates at Kutina interchange of the A3 motorway

D45 connects the A3 motorway Kutina interchange to Kutina, Garešnica and the D5 state road. The road forms two junctions to the D26 state road, one in Garešnica, where D26 branches off to Daruvar, and another 3 km (1.9 mi) further north, where the D26 branches off to Čazma and Vrbovec. Between those two junctions the D45 and D26 are concurrent. The northern terminus of the road is in Veliki Zdenci, at a junction to the D5 state road to Virovitica (to the north) and Daruvar and Pakrac (to the south). The road is 43.6 km (27.1 mi) long.

The road, as well as all other state roads in Croatia, is managed and maintained by Hrvatske ceste, a state-owned company.

== Traffic volume ==
Traffic is regularly counted and reported by Hrvatske ceste, operator of the road.

D45 traffic volume
Road	Counting site	AADT	ASDT	Notes
D45	2207 Veliki Zdenci	1,340	1,563	Adjacent to the Ž3136 junction.
D45	2209 Hercegovac	2,052	2,219	Adjacent to the Ž3133 junction.
D45	2115 Kapelica	2,647	2,892	Adjacent to the D26 junction.

== Road junctions and populated areas ==
D45 junctions/populated areas
Type	Slip roads/Notes
	Veliki Zdenci; D5 to Virovitica (D2) (to the north) and Daruvar and Pakrac (to the south). D28 to Bjelovar. Ž3136 to Tomašica and Garešnica (D26). The northern terminus of the road.
	Hercegovac; Ž3133 to Ladislav and Pavlovac (D28). Ž3135 to the Ž3136 county road.
	Palešnik
	Zdenčac
	Garešnički Brestovac
	D26 to Čazma and D10 expressway Dubrava interchange (to the west). The D26 and D45 state roads are concurrent to the south.
	Garešnica; D26 to Daruvar (D5) (to the east). The D26 and D45 state roads are concurrent to the north. Ž3165 to Dišnik.
	Kapelica
	Rogoža; Ž3166 to Veliko Vukovje.
	Šartovac
	Ž3164 to Kutinska Slatina.
	Ž3163 to Selište.
	Kutina; Ž3124 to Popovača (to the west) and to Novska (D47) (to the east).
	A3 Kutina interchange, to Zagreb (to the west) and to Slavonski Brod (to the east). The southern terminus of the road.
