= Brđani =

Brđani is a Serbo-Croatian toponym, meaning "Highlanders". It may refer to:

- Brđani, Brus, a village in Serbia
- Brđani, Gornji Milanovac, a village in Serbia
- Brđani, Novi Pazar, a village in Serbia
- Brđani, Ripanj, a borough of Belgrade, Serbia
- Brđani, Konjic, a village in Bosnia and Herzegovina
- Brđani, Tuzla, a village in Bosnia and Herzegovina
- Brđani, Požega-Slavonia County, a village in Croatia
- Požeški Brđani, a village near Brestovac, Požega-Slavonia County, Croatia
- Brđani, Brod-Posavina County, a village near Pleternica, Croatia
- Brđani Cesta, a village in Sisak-Moslavina County, Croatia
- Brđani Sokolovački, a village near Sokolovac, Koprivnica-Križevci County, Croatia

== See also ==
- Brda (Montenegro), a historical tribal region, also known as Brđani
- Pobrđani (disambiguation)
