= Hercegovac =

Hercegovac may refer to:

- Hercegovac, Croatia, a village and a municipality in Bjelovar-Bilogora County, Croatia
- FK Hercegovac (disambiguation)
- KK Hercegovac (disambiguation)
