= Kutina =

- Town
- Grad Kutina; Town of Kutina
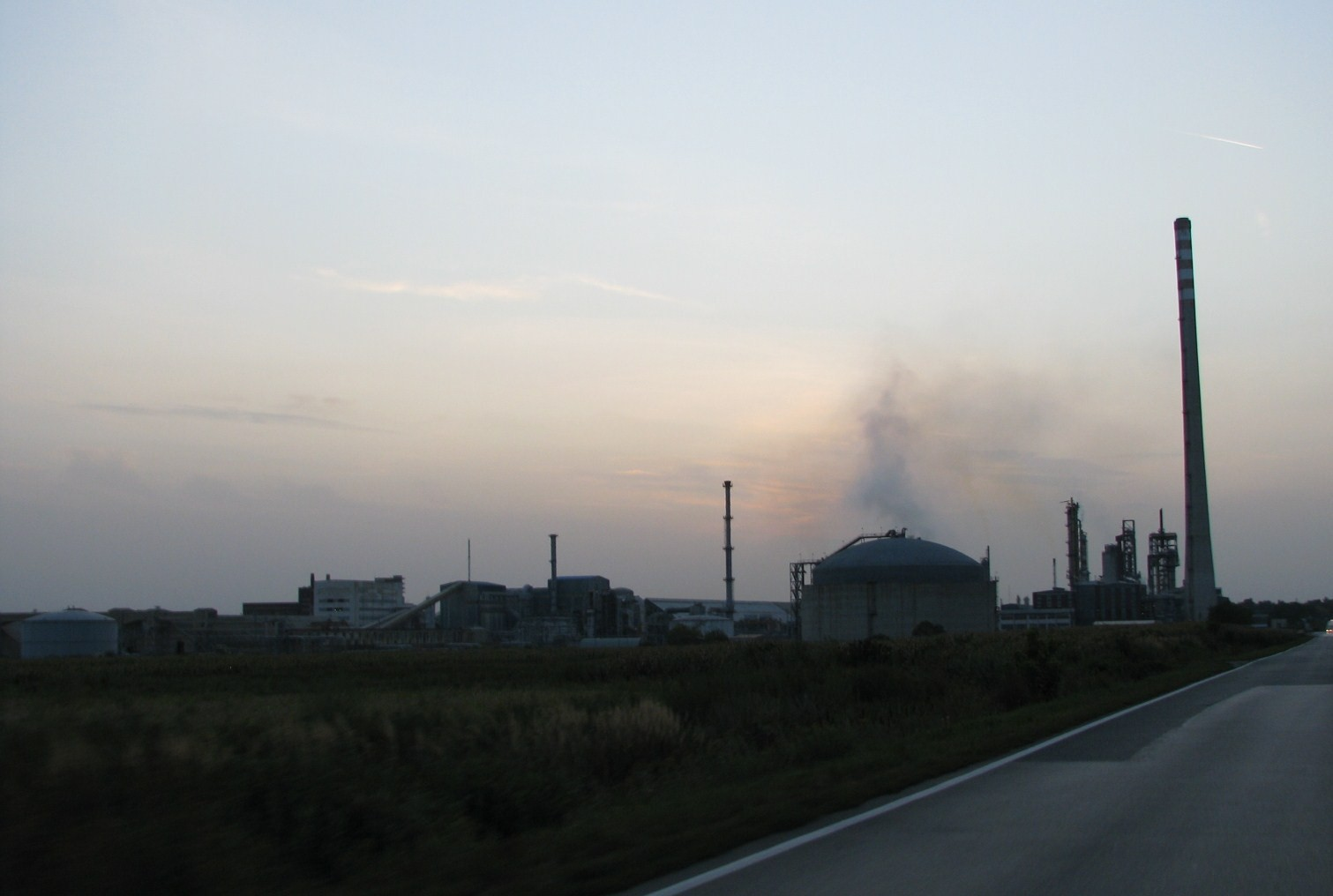
- Kutina Petrochemical Plant
- Interactive map of Kutina
- Location of Kutina in Croatia
- Coordinates: 45.481966°N 16.778499°E
- Country: Croatia
- Region: Central Croatia (Moslavina)
- County: Sisak-Moslavina County

Government
  - Mayor: Zlatko Babić (Ind.)
  - City Council: 22 members: • HDZ, HSLS, HSP, HSP AS, HSU (9); • SDP, BM 365, DSU, BUZ, HL, SDA, HDRS (9); • MOST (2); • NL Davor Pranić (2)

Area
  - Town: 294.8 km^{2} (113.8 sq mi)
  - Urban: 49.6 km^{2} (19.2 sq mi)
- Elevation: 149 m (489 ft)

Population (2021)
  - Town: 19,601
  - Density: 66.49/km^{2} (172.2/sq mi)
  - Urban: 12,012
  - Urban density: 242/km^{2} (627/sq mi)
- Time zone: UTC+1 (CET)
  - Summer (DST): UTC+2 (CEST)
- Postal code: HR-44 320
- Area code: +385 44
- Vehicle registration: KT
- Website: kutina.hr

Kutina is a town in central Croatia, the largest settlement in the hilly region of Moslavina, in the Sisak-Moslavina County. The town proper has a population of 13,735 (2011), while the total municipal population is 22,760.

== Geography ==
The river Kutina flows through the town, originating from the nearby Moslavačka gora. The town is located north of the A3 motorway, the M103 railway and in turn the Lonjsko polje. It is connected by the D45 road to the motorway and to Garešnica in the northeast, and with a county road to Popovača in the northwest and Novska in the southeast.

== History ==
The settlement of Kutina was first mentioned in the historical records in 1256.

== Economy ==
It is the industrial center of the region with petrochemical industry – Petrokemija d.d., electronic components production – SELK d.d., and a variety of smaller entrepreneurships. There is a long mass-media tradition in Kutina, with Moslavački list [local newspaper] and Radio Moslavina [local radio station]. The initial headquarters of the Nezavisna Televizija (NeT), a regional commercial TV station, were stationed in Voloder near Kutina.

== Culture ==
Kutina is widely known for its active youth scene and the alternative-oriented club Baraka. The main attractions are Lonjsko polje nature park, baroque fortress church of Saint Mary of the Snow, old wooden houses called Trijem (eng. Porch) or Čardak, hills of Moslavina with ruins of medieval "burgs".

A special attraction are the Wine roads of Moslavina, where a visitor can take a sip of Croatian and regional genuine wine Škrlet (Skrlet).

== Climate ==
Since records began in 1981, the highest temperature recorded at the local weather station was 40.2 °C (104.4 °F), on 4 August 2012. The coldest temperature was −21.5 °C (−6.7 °F), on 12 January 1985.

== Demographics ==
The settlements in the administrative area are:

- Banova Jaruga, population 665
- Batina, population 205
- Brinjani, population 253
- Čaire, population 33
- Gojlo, population 377
- Husain, population 971
- Ilova, population 821
- Jamarica, population 410
- Janja Lipa, population 206
- Katoličke Čaire, population 232
- Kletište, population 116
- Krajiška Kutinica, population 73
- Kutina, population 13,735
- Kutinica, population 58
- Kutinska Slatina, population 578
- Međurić, population 485
- Mikleuška, population 140
- Mišinka, population 116
- Repušnica, population 1,838
- Selište, population 282
- Stupovača, population 440
- Šartovac, population 383
- Zbjegovača, population 346
Town of Kutina: Population trends 1857–2021
v

population	7177	7067	7795	9008	11119	12866	13380	14991	16597	17242	18804	21128	23202	24829	24597	22760	19601
	1857	1869	1880	1890	1900	1910	1921	1931	1948	1953	1961	1971	1981	1991	2001	2011	2021

Sources: Croatian Bureau of Statistics publications

== History ==
In the late 19th and early 20th century, Kutina was a district capital in the Bjelovar-Križevci County of the Kingdom of Croatia-Slavonia.

== Politics ==
=== Minority councils and representatives ===
Directly elected minority councils and representatives are tasked with consulting tasks for the local or regional authorities in which they are advocating for minority rights and interests, integration into public life and participation in the management of local affairs. At the 2023 Croatian national minorities councils and representatives elections Czechs, Roma and Serbs of Croatia all fulfilled legal requirements to each elect their own 15 members minority council of the Town of Kutina yet Romani community elected only 11 and Serb only 13 members into their councils.

== Notable people born in Kutina ==
- Dubravka Ugrešić – Croatian writer, winner of 2010 Tiptree Award, 2000 Heinrich Mann Prize, and 1988 NIN Prize, among others.
- Franjo Mihalić – Yugoslav long-distance runner, Olympic silver medalist in marathon and cross country World champion
- Dane Korica – long-distance runner who competed for Yugoslavia in the 1972 Summer Olympics
- Marijana Petir - Croatian politician, a Member of the European Parliament
