= Dubrava, Zagreb County =

Dubrava
- Municipality
- Municipality of Dubrava
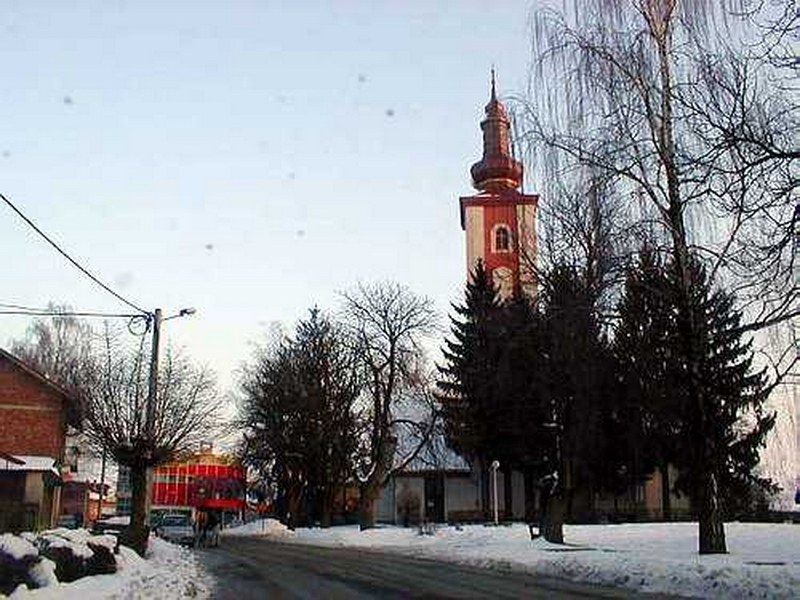
- Interactive map of Dubrava
- Location of Dubrava in Croatia
- Coordinates: 45°49′48″N 16°30′36″E
- Country: Croatia
- County: Zagreb County

Area
  - Municipality: 115.7 km^{2} (44.7 sq mi)
  - Urban: 8.0 km^{2} (3.1 sq mi)

Population (2021)
  - Municipality: 4,520
  - Density: 39.1/km^{2} (101/sq mi)
  - Urban: 1,233
  - Urban density: 150/km^{2} (400/sq mi)
- Time zone: UTC+1 (Central European Time)
- Vehicle registration: ZG
- Website: opcina-dubrava.hr

Dubrava is a village and a municipality ("općina") in Zagreb County, Croatia.

According to the 2001 Croatian census, there are 5,478 inhabitants in the municipality, 94% which are Croats. They live in 27 naselja:

- Bađinec - 173
- Brezje - 121
- Donji Marinkovac - 101
- Donji Vukšinac - 103
- Dubrava - 1,275
- Dubravski Markovac - 169
- Gornji Marinkovac - 157
- Gornji Vukšinac - 146
- Graberec - 226
- Habjanovac - 200
- Koritna - 204
- Kostanj - 102
- Kunđevac - 92
- Ladina - 125
- Mostari - 211
- Nova Kapela - 279
- Novaki - 232
- Paruževac - 157
- Pehardovac - 16
- Podlužan - 185
- Radulec - 132
- Stara Kapela - 242
- Svinjarec - 63
- Zetkan - 209
- Zgališće - 180
- Zvekovac - 217
- Žukovec - 161

The total area of Dubrava is 4.41 square kilometers (1.70 sq mi).
