= Grabik =

Grabik may refer to:

- Grabik, Lower Silesian Voivodeship, a village in southwestern Poland
- Grabik, Lubusz Voivodeship, a village in western Poland
- Grabik, Croatia, a village near Čazma
