= Prokljuvani =

Prokljuvani may refer to:

- Prokljuvani, Bjelovar, a village in Croatia
- Prokljuvani, Čazma, a village in Croatia
