= Tomašica =

Tomašica can refer to one of the following towns:

- Tomašica, Bosnia and Herzegovina
- Tomašica, Croatia
