= Koritna =

Koritna may refer to the following places in Croatia:

- Koritna, Osijek-Baranja County
- Koritna, Zagreb County
