= Garešnica =

- Town
- Grad Garešnica; Town of Garešnica
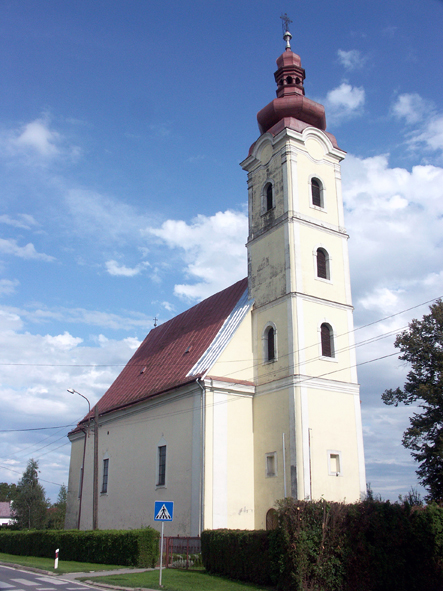
- Church in Garešnica
- Interactive map of Garešnica
- Location of Garešnica in Croatia
- Coordinates: 45.57°N 16.94°E
- Country: Croatia
- Region: Central Croatia (Moslavina)
- County: Bjelovar-Bilogora County

Government
  - Mayor: Josip Bilandžija (HDZ)

Area
  - Town: 226.3 km^{2} (87.4 sq mi)
  - Urban: 16.5 km^{2} (6.4 sq mi)

Population (2021)
  - Town: 8,624
  - Density: 38.11/km^{2} (98.70/sq mi)
  - Urban: 3,294
  - Urban density: 200/km^{2} (517/sq mi)
- Time zone: UTC+1 (CET)
  - Summer (DST): UTC+2 (CEST)
- Postal code: 43280
- Area code: 043
- Website: garesnica.eu

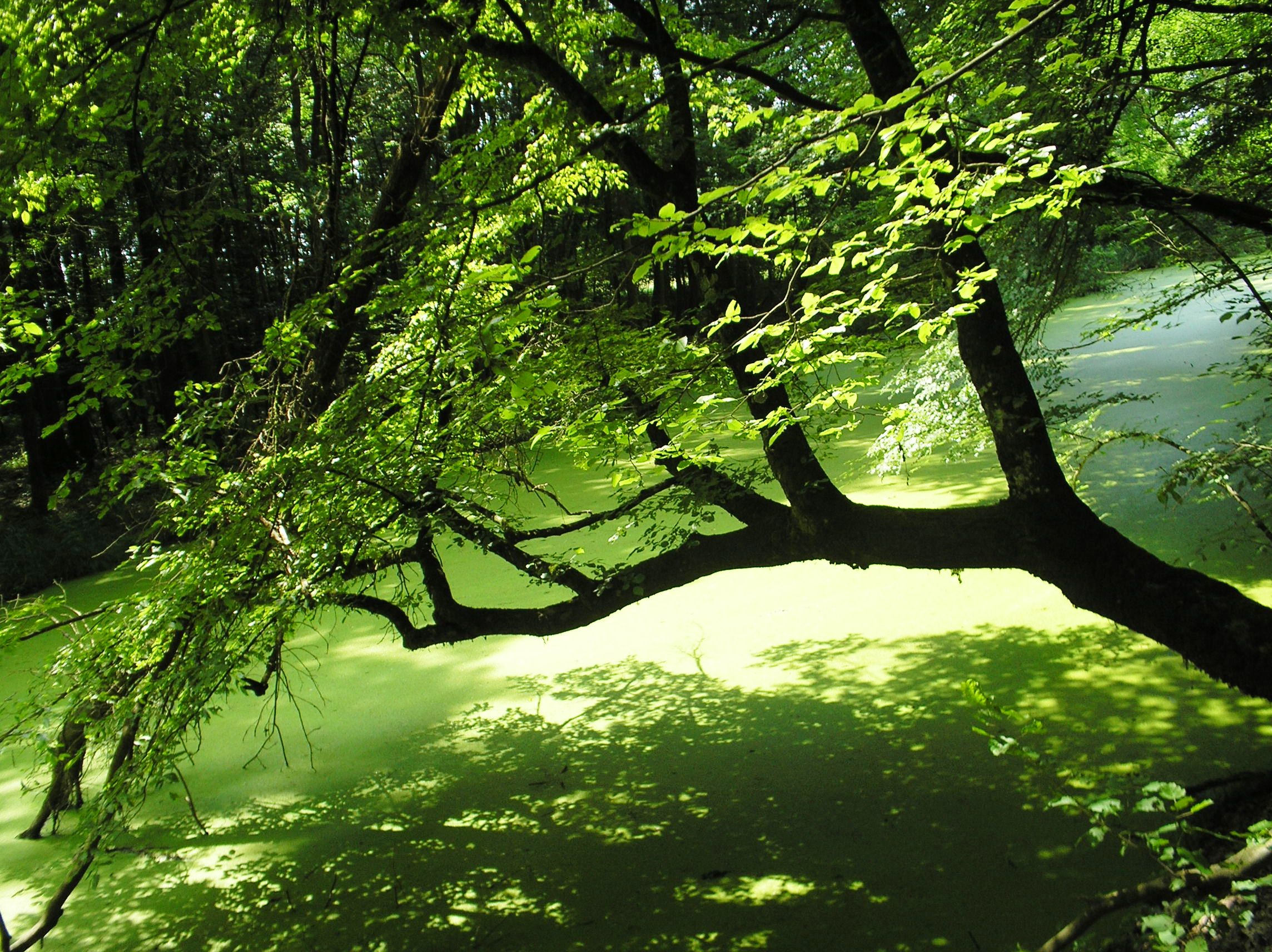
Ilovski Lug forest near Garešnica

Garešnica is a town in Bjelovar-Bilogora County, Croatia. It is located in the geographical region of Moslavina. There are a total of 10,472 inhabitants, of whom 85% are Croats.

== Geography ==
Garešnica is located in central Croatia at the foot of Moslavačka gora mountain, 17 km (10.56 mi) northeast of Kutina, on the crossroad of D45 (Kutina – Veliki Zdenci) and D26 (Vrbovec – Daruvar) state roads.

The river Garešnica flows to the west of the town into the Ilova, which flows to the east of the town, near the confluence of the Toplica.

== History ==
It was first mentioned in 1527. The church Visitation of Our Lady was built in 1752 and has still a lot of original inventory.

In the late 19th and early 20th century, Garešnica was a district capital in the Bjelovar-Križevci County of the Kingdom of Croatia-Slavonia.

The town is home to a memorial to its deceased defenders from the Croatian War of Independence.

== Settlements ==
The following settlements comprise the Town of Garešnica:

- Ciglenica, population 368
- Dišnik, population 343
- Duhovi, population 111
- Garešnica, population 3,874
- Garešnički Brestovac, population 908
- Gornji Uljanik, population 116
- Hrastovac, population 479
- Kajgana, population 271
- Kaniška Iva, population 466
- Kapelica, population 546
- Mala Bršljanica, population 48
- Mali Pašijan, population 190
- Malo Vukovje, population 122
- Rogoža, population 248
- Tomašica, population 365
- Trnovitički Popovac, population 392
- Uljanički Brijeg, population 26
- Uljanik, population 287
- Velika Bršljanica, population 228
- Veliki Pašijan, population 344
- Veliki Prokop, population 48
- Veliko Vukovje, population 251
- Zdenčac, population 441
Town of Garešnica: Population trends 1857–2021
v

population	7629	7918	8513	11632	13371	14189	14546	15462	15048	15154	14281	12503	12336	12186	11630	10472	8624
	1857	1869	1880	1890	1900	1910	1921	1931	1948	1953	1961	1971	1981	1991	2001	2011	2021

Sources: Croatian Bureau of Statistics publications

== Politics ==
=== Minority councils and representatives ===
Directly elected minority councils and representatives are tasked with consulting tasks for the local or regional authorities in which they are advocating for minority rights and interests, integration into public life and participation in the management of local affairs. At the 2023 Croatian national minorities councils and representatives elections Serbs of Croatia fulfilled legal requirements to elect 15 members minority council of the Town of Garešnica while Czechs elected individual representative.

== Notable people ==
- Slavko Kolar (1891–1963), writer
- Ivo Robić (1923–2000), singer and songwriter
- Boris Buden (born 1958), philosopher
