= Grabovnica =

Grabovnica may refer to:

- Grabovnica, Croatia
- Grabovnica, Serbia
