= Blagorodovac =

- Village
- Location within Croatia
- Country: Croatia
- County: Bjelovar-Bilogora County
- Municipality: Dežanovac

Area
  - Total: 5.1 sq mi (13.1 km^{2})

Population (2021)
  - Total: 155
  - Density: 30.6/sq mi (11.8/km^{2})
- Time zone: UTC+1 (CET)
  - Summer (DST): UTC+2 (CEST)

Blagorodovac (German: Blagorodowatz) is a village in Croatia. It is connected by the D26 highway. The village is situated northwest of Gornji Uljanik.

== History ==
The Regulation and Decree of December 31, 1858 renewed the Austrian Empire call for agricultural settlement across Croatia and Slavonia. Rules included a minimum of 50 families per settlement, with all settlers sharing one nationality and one religion. Blagorodovac was among ten villages founded by German-speaking Danube Swabians, with settlers arriving from the Kingdom of Hungary. It was established in 1866 and the contract between the settlers and noble was ratified the same year. Blagorodovac was carved from heavily forested wilderness, and clearing the land was the settlers' first major task.

== Demographics ==
According to the 2021 census, its population was 155.
