= Dereza =

Dereza may refer to:

- Dereza, Požega-Slavonia County, a village near Pakrac, Croatia
- Dereza, Bjelovar-Bilogora County, a village near Čazma, Croatia
- Dereza (film), a 1985 Soviet animated musical film
