= Goveđe Polje =

- Village
- Location within Croatia
- Coordinates: 45.5201802°N 17.0611909°E
- Country: Croatia
- County: Bjelovar-Bilogora County
- Municipality: Dežanovac

Area
  - Total: 3.4 sq mi (8.8 km^{2})

Population (2021)
  - Total: 73
  - Density: 21/sq mi (8.3/km^{2})
- Time zone: UTC+1 (CET)
  - Summer (DST): UTC+2 (CEST)

Goveđe Polje is a village in Croatia.

== Demographics ==
According to the 2021 census, its population was 73.
