= Hrastovac, Bjelovar-Bilogora County =

Hrastovac
- Village
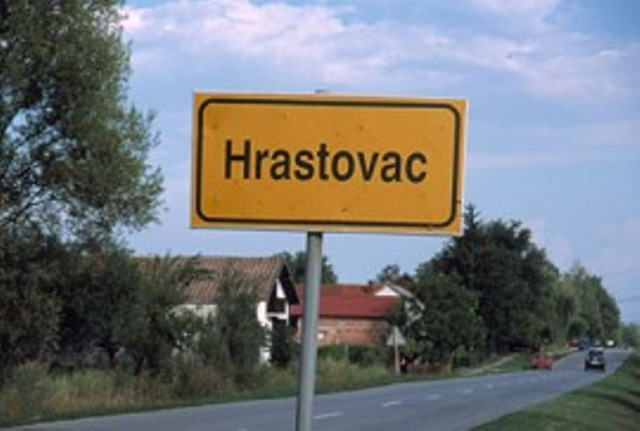

- Location within Croatia
- Coordinates: 45°33′05″N 16°59′20″E
- Country: Croatia
- County: Bjelovar-Bilogora County
- Municipality: Garešnica

Area
  - Total: 3.2 sq mi (8.3 km^{2})
- Elevation: 371 ft (113 m)

Population (2021)
  - Total: 370
  - Density: 120/sq mi (45/km^{2})
- Time zone: UTC+1 (CET)
  - Summer (DST): UTC+2 (CEST)
- Postal code: 43280 Garešnica
- Area code: 043
- Vehicle registration: BJ

Hrastovac (German: Eichendorf) is a settlement in the municipality Garešnica, Bjelovar-Bilogora County in Croatia. It is connected by the D26 highway.

== History ==
The Regulation and Decree of December 31, 1858 renewed the Austrian Empire call for agricultural settlement across Croatia and Slavonia. Rules included a minimum of 50 families per settlement, with all settlers sharing one nationality and one religion. Hrastovac was among ten villages founded by German-speaking Danube Swabians, with settlers arriving from the Kingdom of Hungary. It was established in 1866 as "Eichendorf" and the contract between the settlers and noble was ratified the same year. Hrastovac was carved from heavily forested wilderness, and clearing the land was the settlers' first major task.

== Demographics ==
According to the 2021 census, its population was 370. According to the 2001 census, there were 539 inhabitants, in 167 of family households.
