= Cerina, Croatia =

Cerina
- Village
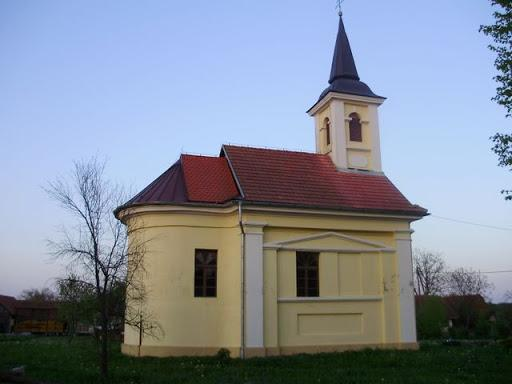

- Location within Croatia
- Coordinates: 45°46′24″N 16°34′22″E
- Country: Croatia
- County: Bjelovar-Bilogora County
- Municipality: Čazma

Area
  - Total: 3.1 sq mi (8.1 km^{2})
- Elevation: 397 ft (121 m)

Population (2021)
  - Total: 89
  - Density: 28/sq mi (11/km^{2})
- Time zone: UTC+1 (CET)
  - Summer (DST): UTC+2 (CEST)
- Postal code: 43240 Čazma
- Area code: 043
- Vehicle registration: BJ

Cerina, Croatia is a village in the municipality Čazma, Bjelovar-Bilogora County in Croatia. It is connected by the D26 highway.

== Demographics ==
According to the 2021 census, its population was 89.

According to the 2001 census, there were 125 inhabitants, in 46 family households.
