= Pobjenik =

- Village
- Location within Croatia
- Coordinates: 45°42′38″N 16°38′58″E
- Country: Croatia
- County: Bjelovar-Bilogora County
- Municipality: Čazma

Area
  - Total: 13.6 km^{2} (5.3 sq mi)
- Elevation: 120 m (390 ft)

Population (2021)
  - Total: 181
  - Density: 13.3/km^{2} (34.5/sq mi)
- Time zone: UTC+1 (CET)
  - Summer (DST): UTC+2 (CEST)
- Postal code: 43240 Čazma
- Area code: 043
- Vehicle registration: BJ

Pobjenik is a village in the municipality of Čazma, Bjelovar-Bilogora County in Croatia. Pobjenik is located on the north-western slopes of Moslavačka gora.

== Demographics ==
According to the 2021 census, its population was 181.

In the 2011 census, there are 215 inhabitants. In the 2001 census, there were 259 inhabitants in 100 family households.
