= Drlež =

- Village
- Location within Croatia
- Coordinates: 45.5487132°N 17.1331812°E
- Country: Croatia
- County: Bjelovar-Bilogora County
- Municipality: Dežanovac

Area
  - Total: 0.62 sq mi (1.6 km^{2})

Population (2021)
  - Total: 11
  - Density: 18/sq mi (6.9/km^{2})
- Time zone: UTC+1 (CET)
  - Summer (DST): UTC+2 (CEST)

Drlež is a village in Croatia.

== Demographics ==
According to the 2021 census, its population was only 11.
