= Suhaja =

- Village
- Location within Croatia
- Coordinates: 45°45′N 16°37′E
- Country: Croatia
- County: Bjelovar-Bilogora County
- Municipality: Čazma

Area
  - Total: 2.6 sq mi (6.7 km^{2})

Population (2021)
  - Total: 177
  - Density: 68/sq mi (26/km^{2})
- Time zone: UTC+1 (CET)
  - Summer (DST): UTC+2 (CEST)

Suhaja is a village in the municipality Čazma, Bjelovar-Bilogora County in Croatia.

== Demographics ==
According to the 2021 census, its population was 177.

According to the 2011 census, there were 204 inhabitants.

Population trends 1857-2001
v

population	186	216	211	258	266	276	296	288	290	329	291	226	191	195	210	204	177
	1857	1869	1880	1890	1900	1910	1921	1931	1948	1953	1961	1971	1981	1991	2001	2011	2021

Sources: Croatian Bureau of Statistics publications
