= Velika Trnava =

- Village
- Location within Croatia
- Coordinates: 45.6780892°N 17.0119382°E
- Country: Croatia
- County: Bjelovar-Bilogora County
- Municipality: Hercegovac

Area
  - Total: 3.2 sq mi (8.2 km^{2})

Population (2021)
  - Total: 247
  - Density: 78/sq mi (30/km^{2})
- Time zone: UTC+1 (CET)
  - Summer (DST): UTC+2 (CEST)

Velika Trnava is a village in Croatia.

== Demographics ==
According to the 2021 census, its population was 247.
