= KK Hercegovac =

KK Hercegovac may refer to:

- KK Hercegovac Bileća, former name of KK HEO, a basketball club based in Bileća, Republika Srpska, Bosnia and Herzegovina
- KK Hercegovac Gajdobra, a basketball club based in Gajdobra, municipality of Bačka Palanka, Vojvodina, Serbia

== See also ==
- FK Hercegovac (disambiguation)
