= Rogoža =

- Village
- Location within Croatia
- Country: Croatia
- County: Bjelovar-Bilogora County
- Municipality: Garešnica

Area
  - Total: 5.6 sq mi (14.4 km^{2})

Population (2021)
  - Total: 194
  - Density: 34.9/sq mi (13.5/km^{2})
- Time zone: UTC+1 (CET)
  - Summer (DST): UTC+2 (CEST)

Rogoža is a village in Croatia. It is connected by the D45 highway.

== Demographics ==
According to the 2021 census, its population was 194.
