= Veliki Pašijan =

- Village
- Location within Croatia
- Country: Croatia
- County: Bjelovar-Bilogora County
- Municipality: Garešnica

Area
  - Total: 2.0 sq mi (5.1 km^{2})

Population (2021)
  - Total: 300
  - Density: 150/sq mi (59/km^{2})
- Time zone: UTC+1 (CET)
  - Summer (DST): UTC+2 (CEST)

Veliki Pašijan is a village in Croatia. It is connected by the D26 highway.

== Demographics ==
According to the 2021 census, its population was 300.
