= Veliki Prokop =

- Village
- Location within Croatia
- Coordinates: 45.6260988°N 16.8131026°E
- Country: Croatia
- County: Bjelovar-Bilogora County
- Municipality: Garešnica

Area
  - Total: 2.8 sq mi (7.2 km^{2})

Population (2021)
  - Total: 25
  - Density: 9.0/sq mi (3.5/km^{2})
- Time zone: UTC+1 (CET)
  - Summer (DST): UTC+2 (CEST)

Veliki Prokop is a village in Croatia.

== Demographics ==
According to the 2021 census, its population was 25.
