= Kapelica, Bjelovar-Bilogora County =

Kapelica
- Village
- Location within Croatia
- Country: Croatia
- County: Bjelovar-Bilogora County
- Municipality: Garešnica

Area
  - Total: 5.2 sq mi (13.5 km^{2})

Population (2021)
  - Total: 442
  - Density: 84.8/sq mi (32.7/km^{2})
- Time zone: UTC+1 (CET)
  - Summer (DST): UTC+2 (CEST)

Kapelica is a village in Croatia. It is connected by the D45 highway.

== Demographics ==
According to the 2021 census, its population was 442.
