= Gornji Lipovčani =

- Village
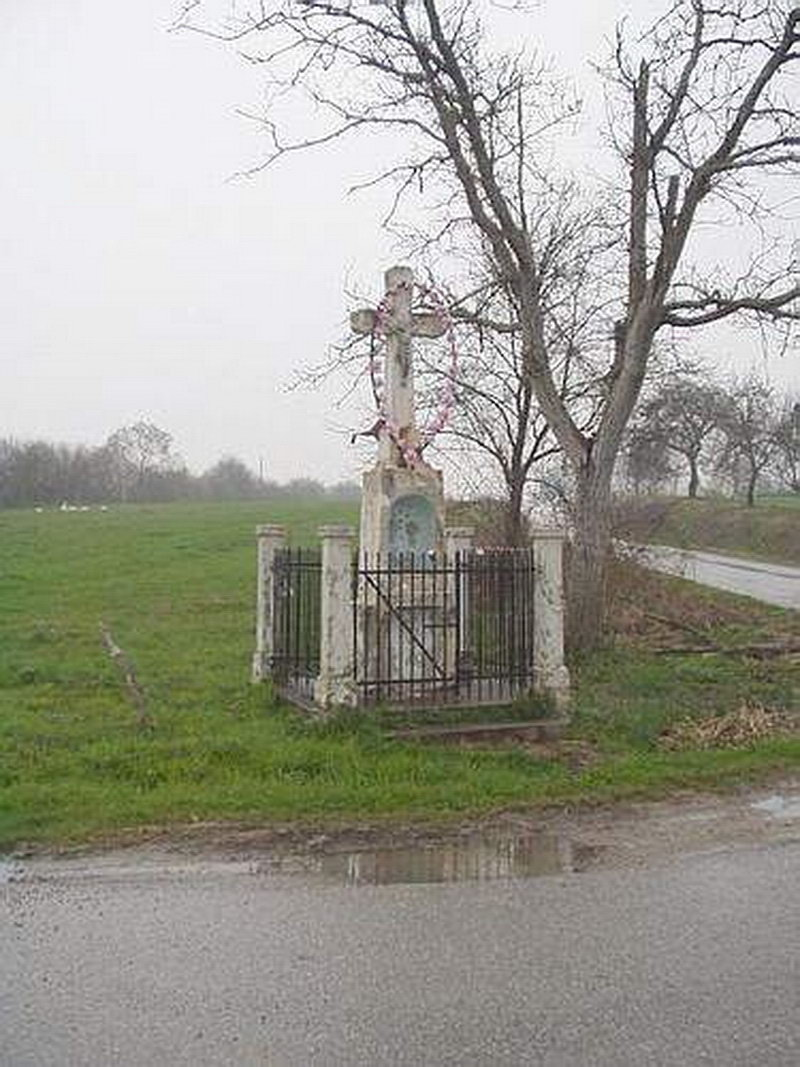
- Cross on the crossroad in Gornji Lipovčani, Croatia

- Location within Croatia
- Coordinates: 45.7684679°N 16.4990178°E
- Country: Croatia
- County: Bjelovar-Bilogora County
- Municipality: Čazma

Area
  - Total: 2.4 sq mi (6.2 km^{2})

Population (2021)
  - Total: 71
  - Density: 30/sq mi (11/km^{2})
- Time zone: UTC+1 (CET)
  - Summer (DST): UTC+2 (CEST)

Gornji Lipovčani is a village in Croatia.

== Demographics ==
According to the 2021 census, its population was 71.
