= Golubinjak =

- Village
- Location within Croatia
- Coordinates: 45.564566°N 17.1356444°E
- Country: Croatia
- County: Bjelovar-Bilogora County
- Municipality: Dežanovac

Area
  - Total: 4.0 sq mi (10.4 km^{2})

Population (2021)
  - Total: 117
  - Density: 29.1/sq mi (11.3/km^{2})
- Time zone: UTC+1 (CET)
  - Summer (DST): UTC+2 (CEST)

Golubinjak is a village in Croatia.

== Demographics ==
According to the 2021 census, its population was 117.
