= Mala Bršljanica =

- Village
- Location within Croatia
- Coordinates: 45.595014°N 16.7823196°E
- Country: Croatia
- County: Bjelovar-Bilogora County
- Municipality: Garešnica

Area
  - Total: 6.4 sq mi (16.5 km^{2})

Population (2021)
  - Total: 31
  - Density: 4.9/sq mi (1.9/km^{2})
- Time zone: UTC+1 (CET)
  - Summer (DST): UTC+2 (CEST)

Mala Bršljanica is a village in Croatia.

== Demographics ==
According to the 2021 census, its population was 31.
