= Bojana, Croatia =

Bojana
- Village
- Location within Croatia
- Coordinates: 45.7594582°N 16.6579111°E
- Country: Croatia
- County: Bjelovar-Bilogora County
- Municipality: Čazma

Area
  - Total: 5.9 sq mi (15.3 km^{2})

Population (2021)
  - Total: 158
  - Density: 26.7/sq mi (10.3/km^{2})
- Time zone: UTC+1 (CET)
  - Summer (DST): UTC+2 (CEST)

Bojana is a village in Croatia.

== Demographics ==
According to the 2021 census, its population was 158.
