= Donji Miklouš =

- Village
- Location within Croatia
- Country: Croatia
- County: Bjelovar-Bilogora County
- Municipality: Čazma

Area
  - Total: 15.9 sq mi (41.2 km^{2})

Population (2021)
  - Total: 146
  - Density: 9.18/sq mi (3.54/km^{2})
- Time zone: UTC+1 (CET)
  - Summer (DST): UTC+2 (CEST)

Donji Miklouš is a village in Croatia. It is connected by the D26 highway.

== Demographics ==
According to the 2021 census, its population was 146.
