= Repušnica =

- Coordinates: 45.494842°N 16.730608°E

Area
  - Total: 29.3 km^{2} (11.3 sq mi)

Population (2021)
  - Total: 1,552
  - Density: 53/km^{2} (140/sq mi)

Repušnica is a village in central Croatia located west of Kutina. The population is 1,838 (census 2011).
