= Zdenčac =

- Village
- Location within Croatia
- Country: Croatia
- County: Bjelovar-Bilogora County
- Municipality: Garešnica

Area
  - Total: 2.0 sq mi (5.1 km^{2})

Population (2021)
  - Total: 365
  - Density: 190/sq mi (72/km^{2})
- Time zone: UTC+1 (CET)
  - Summer (DST): UTC+2 (CEST)

Zdenčac is a village in Croatia. It is connected by the D45 highway.

== Demographics ==
According to the 2021 census, its population was 365. It was 441 in 2011.
