= Novo Selo, Bjelovar-Bilogora County =

Novo Selo
- Village
- Location within Croatia
- Coordinates: 45.7157665°N 16.6905493°E
- Country: Croatia
- County: Bjelovar-Bilogora County
- Municipality: Čazma

Area
  - Total: 2.1 sq mi (5.4 km^{2})

Population (2021)
  - Total: 47
  - Density: 23/sq mi (8.7/km^{2})
- Time zone: UTC+1 (CET)
  - Summer (DST): UTC+2 (CEST)

Novo Selo is a village in Croatia. The etymology of the village comes from Slavic languages meaning new village, Novo Selo.

== Demographics ==
According to the 2021 census, its population was 47.
