= Uljanik, Bjelovar-Bilogora County =

Uljanik
- Village
- Location within Croatia
- Coordinates: 45°32′00″N 17°01′20″E
- Country: Croatia
- County: Bjelovar-Bilogora County
- Municipality: Garešnica

Area
  - Total: 6.0 sq mi (15.6 km^{2})
- Elevation: 436 ft (133 m)

Population (2021)
  - Total: 230
  - Density: 38/sq mi (15/km^{2})
- Time zone: UTC+1 (CET)
  - Summer (DST): UTC+2 (CEST)
- Postal code: 43507
- Area code: 043
- Vehicle registration: BJ

Uljanik is a village in the municipality Garešnica, Bjelovar-Bilogora County in Croatia. It is connected by the D26 highway.

== Demographics ==
According to the 2021 census, its population was 230. According to the 2001 census, there were 332 inhabitants, in 113 of family households.
