= Kaštel Dežanovački =

- Village
- Location within Croatia
- Coordinates: 45.5514226°N 17.0699408°E
- Country: Croatia
- County: Bjelovar-Bilogora County
- Municipality: Dežanovac

Area
  - Total: 2.6 sq mi (6.7 km^{2})

Population (2021)
  - Total: 36
  - Density: 14/sq mi (5.4/km^{2})
- Time zone: UTC+1 (CET)
  - Summer (DST): UTC+2 (CEST)

Kaštel Dežanovački is a village in Croatia.

== Demographics ==
According to the 2021 census, its population was 36.
