= Uljanički Brijeg =

- Village
- Location within Croatia
- Coordinates: 45.5261763°N 17.0219621°E
- Country: Croatia
- County: Bjelovar-Bilogora County
- Municipality: Garešnica

Area
  - Total: 1.7 sq mi (4.3 km^{2})

Population (2021)
  - Total: 14
  - Density: 8.4/sq mi (3.3/km^{2})
- Time zone: UTC+1 (CET)
  - Summer (DST): UTC+2 (CEST)

Uljanički Brijeg is a village in Croatia.

== Demographics ==
According to the 2021 census, its population was 14.
