= Gornji Daruvar =

Gornji Daruvar Horní Daruvar (Czech)
- Village
- Location within Croatia
- Country: Croatia
- County: Bjelovar-Bilogora County
- Municipality: Daruvar

Area
  - Total: 5.4 sq mi (13.9 km^{2})

Population (2021)
  - Total: 346
  - Density: 64.5/sq mi (24.9/km^{2})
- Time zone: UTC+1 (CET)
  - Summer (DST): UTC+2 (CEST)

Gornji Daruvar (Czech: Horni Daruvar) is a village in Croatia. It is connected by the D26 highway.

== Demographics ==
According to the 2021 census, its population was 346.
