= Donji Draganec =

- Village
- Location within Croatia
- Coordinates: 45.7752084°N 16.6017303°E
- Country: Croatia
- County: Bjelovar-Bilogora County
- Municipality: Čazma

Area
  - Total: 1.7 sq mi (4.3 km^{2})

Population (2021)
  - Total: 120
  - Density: 72/sq mi (28/km^{2})
- Time zone: UTC+1 (CET)
  - Summer (DST): UTC+2 (CEST)

Donji Draganec is a village in Croatia.

== Demographics ==
According to the 2021 census, its population was 120.
