= Općevac =

- Village
- Location within Croatia
- Coordinates: 45°40′N 16°42′E
- Country: Croatia
- County: Bjelovar-Bilogora County
- Municipality: Čazma

Area
  - Total: 1.1 sq mi (2.8 km^{2})

Population (2021)
  - Total: 93
  - Density: 86/sq mi (33/km^{2})
- Time zone: UTC+1 (CET)
  - Summer (DST): UTC+2 (CEST)

Općevac is a village in the municipality Čazma, Bjelovar-Bilogora County in Croatia.

== Demographics ==
According to the 2021 census, its population was 94.

Population trends 1857-2001
v

population	68	89	117	121	150	146	129	149	177	158	147	150	124	124	129	116	94
	1857	1869	1880	1890	1900	1910	1921	1931	1948	1953	1961	1971	1981	1991	2001	2011	2021

Sources: Croatian Bureau of Statistics publications
