= Pavličani =

- Village
- Location within Croatia
- Coordinates: 45.6885773°N 16.5765853°E
- Country: Croatia
- County: Bjelovar-Bilogora County
- Municipality: Čazma

Area
  - Total: 1.0 sq mi (2.6 km^{2})

Population (2021)
  - Total: 76
  - Density: 76/sq mi (29/km^{2})
- Time zone: UTC+1 (CET)
  - Summer (DST): UTC+2 (CEST)

Pavličani is a village in Croatia.

== Demographics ==
According to the 2021 census, its population was 76.
