= Vrtlinska =

- Village
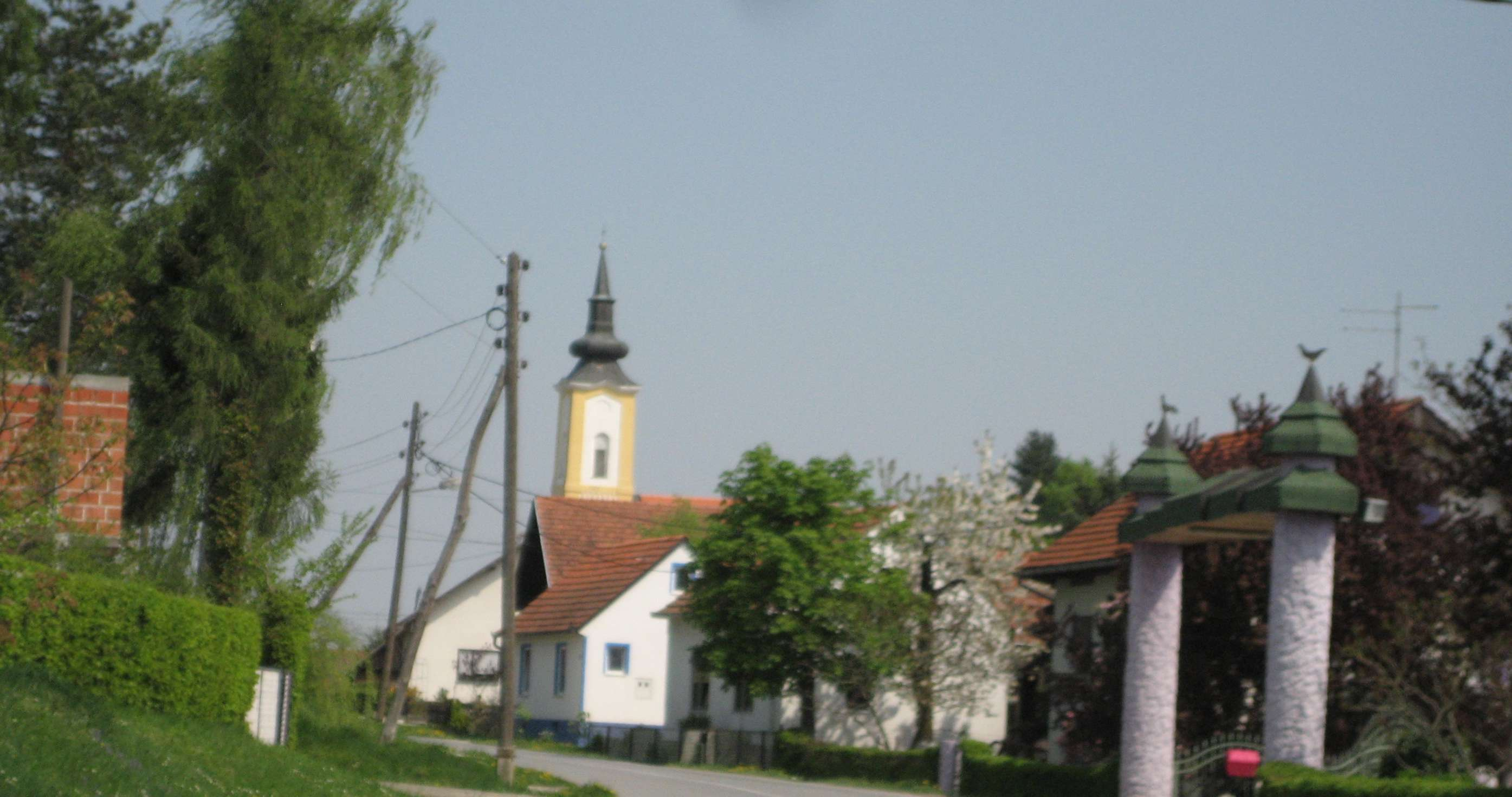
- Vrtlinska

- Location within Croatia
- Coordinates: 45°41′14″N 16°36′50″E
- Country: Croatia
- County: Bjelovar-Bilogora County
- Municipality: Čazma

Area
  - Total: 1.5 sq mi (3.9 km^{2})
- Elevation: 535 ft (163 m)

Population (2021)
  - Total: 128
  - Density: 85/sq mi (33/km^{2})
- Time zone: UTC+1 (CET)
  - Summer (DST): UTC+2 (CEST)
- Postal code: 43240 Čazma
- Area code: 043
- Vehicle registration: BJ

Vrtlinska is a village in the municipality Čazma, Bjelovar-Bilogora County in Croatia. Vrtlinska is located on the north-western slopes of Moslavačka gora.

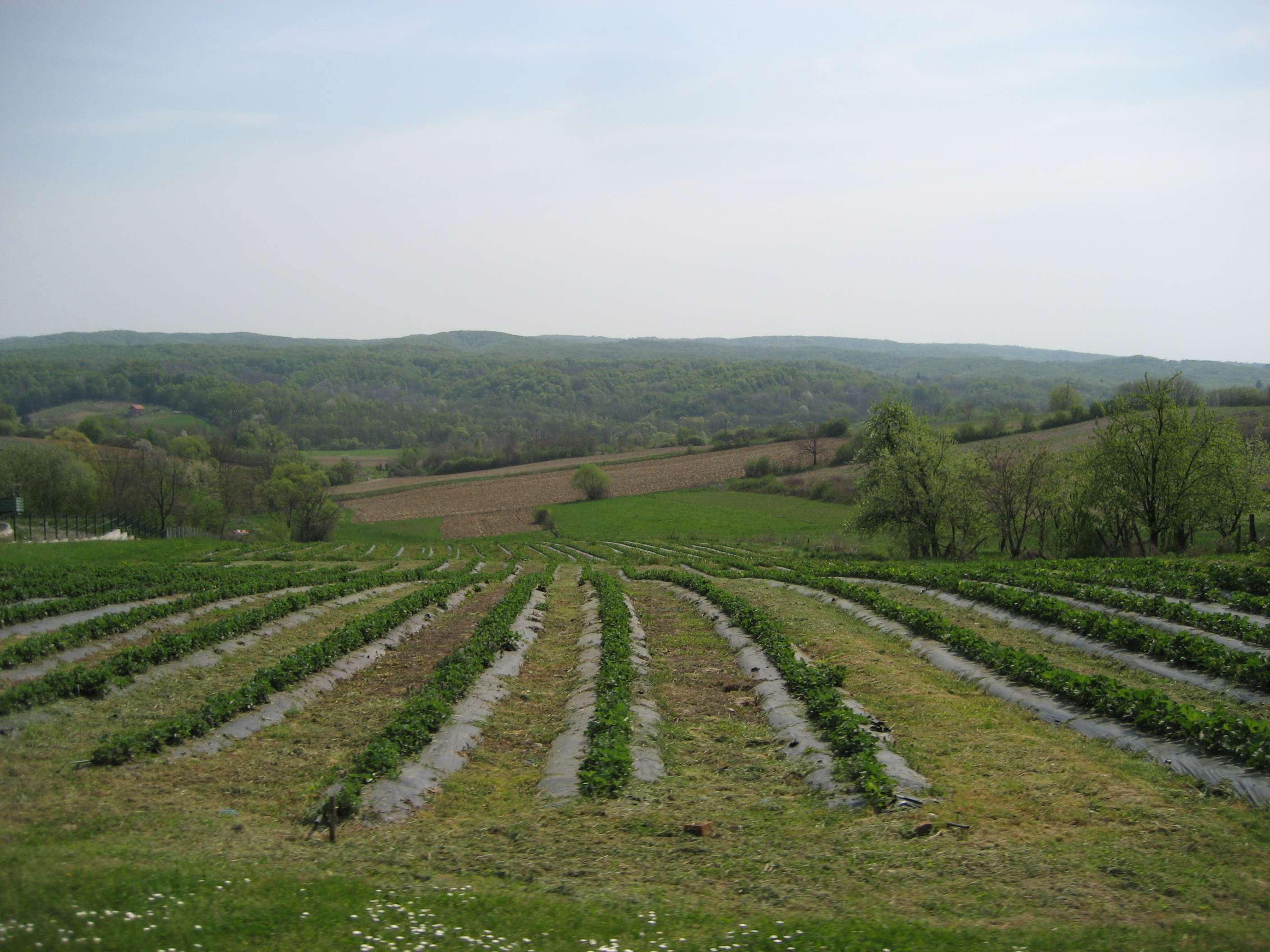
Slopes of Moslavačka gora at Vrtlinska.

== Demographics ==
According to the 2021 census, its population was 128.

According to the 2001 census, there were 222 inhabitants, in 76 of family households.
