= Palešnik =

- Village
- Location within Croatia
- Country: Croatia
- County: Bjelovar-Bilogora County
- Municipality: Hercegovac

Area
  - Total: 3.3 sq mi (8.5 km^{2})

Population (2021)
  - Total: 391
  - Density: 120/sq mi (46/km^{2})
- Time zone: UTC+1 (CET)
  - Summer (DST): UTC+2 (CEST)

Palešnik is a village in Croatia. It is connected by the D45 highway.

== Demographics ==
According to the 2021 census, its population was 391. It was 515 in 2011.
