= Mali Pašijan =

- Village
- Location within Croatia
- Coordinates: 45°38′N 16°56′E
- Country: Croatia
- County: Bjelovar-Bilogora County
- Municipality: Garešnica

Area
  - Total: 2.1 sq mi (5.4 km^{2})

Population (2021)
  - Total: 179
  - Density: 86/sq mi (33/km^{2})
- Time zone: UTC+1 (CET)
  - Summer (DST): UTC+2 (CEST)

Mali Pašijan is a village in Croatia. It is connected by the D26 highway.

== Demographics ==
According to the 2021 census, its population was 179.
