= Donji Sređani =

- Village
- Location within Croatia
- Coordinates: 45.5326941°N 17.1353987°E
- Country: Croatia
- County: Bjelovar-Bilogora County
- Municipality: Dežanovac

Area
  - Total: 2.3 sq mi (6.0 km^{2})

Population (2021)
  - Total: 139
  - Density: 60/sq mi (23/km^{2})
- Time zone: UTC+1 (CET)
  - Summer (DST): UTC+2 (CEST)

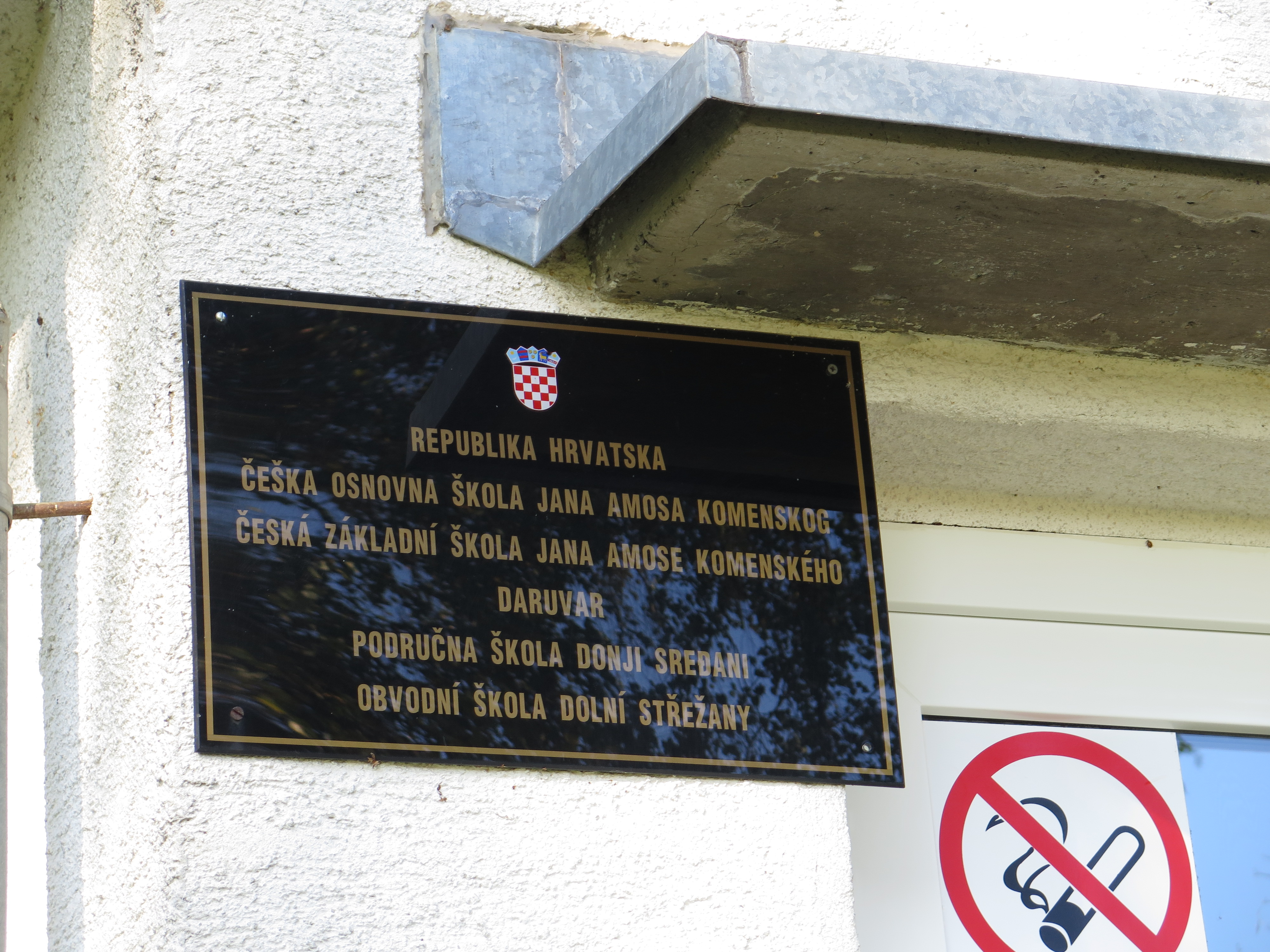

Donji Sređani is a village in Croatia.

== Demographics ==
According to the 2021 census, its population was 139.
