= Ciglenica =

- Village
- Location within Croatia
- Coordinates: 45.5311382°N 16.7142131°E
- Country: Croatia
- County: Bjelovar-Bilogora County
- Municipality: Garešnica

Area
  - Total: 1.9 sq mi (5.0 km^{2})

Population (2021)
  - Total: 283
  - Density: 150/sq mi (57/km^{2})
- Time zone: UTC+1 (CET)
  - Summer (DST): UTC+2 (CEST)

Ciglenica is a village in Croatia.

== Demographics ==
According to the 2021 census, its population was 283.
