= Bađinec =

- Village
- Location within Croatia
- Coordinates: 45°49′N 16°34′E
- Country: Croatia
- County: Zagreb County
- Municipality: Dubrava

Area
  - Total: 4.7 km^{2} (1.8 sq mi)

Population (2021)
  - Total: 135
  - Density: 29/km^{2} (74/sq mi)
- Time zone: UTC+1 (CET)
  - Summer (DST): UTC+2 (CEST)

Bađinec is a village in Croatia. It is connected by the D26 highway.
