= Garešnički Brestovac =

- Village
- Location within Croatia
- Country: Croatia
- County: Bjelovar-Bilogora County
- Municipality: Garešnica

Area
  - Total: 1.2 sq mi (3.0 km^{2})

Population (2021)
  - Total: 769
  - Density: 660/sq mi (260/km^{2})
- Time zone: UTC+1 (CET)
  - Summer (DST): UTC+2 (CEST)

Garešnički Brestovac is a village in Croatia. It is connected by the D45 highway.

== Demographics ==
According to the 2021 census, its population was 769. It was 908 in 2011.
