= Andigola =

- Village
- Location within Croatia
- Coordinates: 45°40′N 16°42′E
- Country: Croatia
- County: Bjelovar-Bilogora County
- Municipality: Čazma

Area
  - Total: 1.6 sq mi (4.1 km^{2})

Population (2021)
  - Total: 12
  - Density: 7.6/sq mi (2.9/km^{2})
- Time zone: UTC+1 (CET)
  - Summer (DST): UTC+2 (CEST)

Andigola is a village in the municipality Čazma, Bjelovar-Bilogora County in Croatia.

== Demographics ==
According to the 2021 census, its population was 12.

Population trends 1857-2001
v

population						19	30	23	143	151	127	77	46	22	14		12
	1857	1869	1880	1890	1900	1910	1921	1931	1948	1953	1961	1971	1981	1991	2001	2011	2021

Sources: Croatian Bureau of Statistics publications
