= Ilovski Klokočevac =

- Village
- Location within Croatia
- Coordinates: 45.6292202°N 17.0213085°E
- Country: Croatia
- County: Bjelovar-Bilogora County
- Municipality: Hercegovac

Area
  - Total: 2.4 sq mi (6.3 km^{2})

Population (2021)
  - Total: 126
  - Density: 52/sq mi (20/km^{2})
- Time zone: UTC+1 (CET)
  - Summer (DST): UTC+2 (CEST)

Ilovski Klokočevac is a village in Croatia.

== Demographics ==
According to the 2021 census, its population was 126.
