= Pobrđani =

Pobrđani may refer to:

- Pobrđani, Bjelovar-Bilogora County, a village in Croatia
- Pobrđani, Donji Vakuf, a village in Bosnia and Herzegovina
- Pobrđani, Kostajnica, a village in Republika Srpska, Bosnia and Herzegovina
- Pobrđani, Kozarska Dubica, a village in Republika Srpska, Bosnia and Herzegovina
