= Trojeglava =

- Village
- Location within Croatia
- Country: Croatia
- County: Bjelovar-Bilogora County
- Municipality: Dežanovac

Area
  - Total: 4.9 sq mi (12.7 km^{2})

Population (2021)
  - Total: 220
  - Density: 45/sq mi (17/km^{2})
- Time zone: UTC+1 (CET)
  - Summer (DST): UTC+2 (CEST)

Trojeglava is a village in Croatia.

== Demographics ==
According to the 2021 census, its population was 220. It had a population of about 254 in 2011.
