= Grabovnica, Croatia =

Grabovnica
- Village
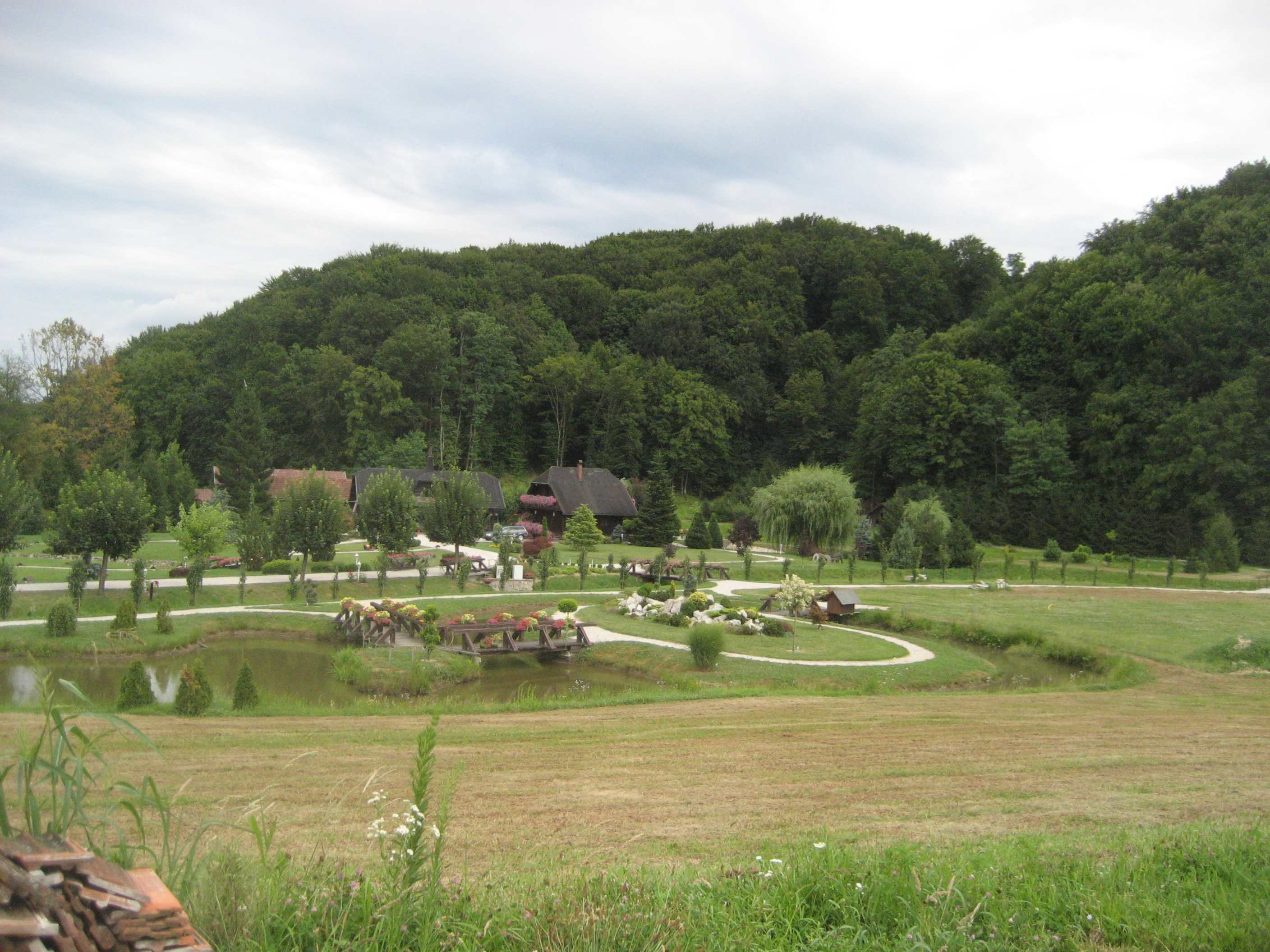
- Christmas Story Ground, Grabovnica

- Location within Croatia
- Country: Croatia
- County: Bjelovar-Bilogora County
- Municipality: Čazma

Area
  - Total: 2.4 sq mi (6.2 km^{2})

Population (2021)
  - Total: 326
  - Density: 140/sq mi (53/km^{2})
- Time zone: UTC+1 (CET)
  - Summer (DST): UTC+2 (CEST)

Grabovnica is a village in Croatia. It is connected by the D26 highway.

== Demographics ==
According to the 2021 census, its population was 326.
