= Selište, Croatia =

Coordinates: 45°33′20″N 16°45′44″E

Selište
- Village
- Interactive map of Selište
- Country: Croatia
- County: Sisak-Moslavina
- Municipality: Kutina

Area
  - Total: 15.0 km^{2} (5.8 sq mi)

Population (2021)
  - Total: 241
  - Density: 16.1/km^{2} (41.6/sq mi)
- Time zone: UTC+1 (CET)
  - Summer (DST): UTC+2 (CEST)

Selište is a village in Croatia. It is located in Sisak-Movalina, about 6 km from Kutina.
