= Svinjarec =

Coordinates: 45°48′N 16°34′E

- Village
- Interactive map of Svinjarec
- Country: Croatia
- County: Zagreb County

Area
  - Total: 5.0 km^{2} (1.9 sq mi)

Population (2021)
  - Total: 41
  - Density: 8.2/km^{2} (21/sq mi)
- Time zone: UTC+1 (CET)
  - Summer (DST): UTC+2 (CEST)

Svinjarec is a village in Croatia. It is connected by the D26 highway.
