= Sokolovac, Bjelovar-Bilogora County =

Sokolovac
- Village
- Location within Croatia
- Coordinates: 45°35′06″N 17°01′35″E
- Country: Croatia
- County: Bjelovar-Bilogora County
- Municipality: Dežanovac

Area
  - Total: 5.2 sq mi (13.5 km^{2})
- Elevation: 377 ft (115 m)

Population (2021)
  - Total: 176
  - Density: 33.8/sq mi (13.0/km^{2})
- Time zone: UTC+1 (CET)
  - Summer (DST): UTC+2 (CEST)
- Postal code: 43506 Dežanovac
- Area code: 043
- Vehicle registration: DA

Sokolovac (German: Sokolowatz) is a village in the municipality Dežanovac, Bjelovar-Bilogora County in Croatia.

== History ==
The Regulation and Decree of December 31, 1858 renewed the Austrian Empire call for agricultural settlement across Croatia and Slavonia. Rules included a minimum of 50 families per settlement, with all settlers sharing one nationality and one religion. Sokolovac was among ten villages founded by German-speaking Danube Swabians, with settlers arriving from the Kingdom of Hungary. It was established in 1866 and the contract between the settlers and noble was ratified in 1877. Sokolovac was carved from heavily forested wilderness, and clearing the land was the settlers' first major task.

== Demographics ==
According to the 2021 census, its population was 176. According to the 2001 census, there were 255 inhabitants, in 85 family households.
