= Brđani, Konjic =

Brđani Брђани
- Village
- Location within Bosnia and Herzegovina
- Coordinates: 43°42′20″N 18°00′45″E
- Country: Bosnia and Herzegovina
- Entity: Federation of Bosnia and Herzegovina
- Canton: Herzegovina-Neretva
- Municipality: Konjic

Area
  - Total: 4.75 sq mi (12.31 km^{2})

Population (2013)
  - Total: 194
  - Density: 40.8/sq mi (15.8/km^{2})
- Time zone: UTC+1 (CET)
  - Summer (DST): UTC+2 (CEST)

Brđani (Cyrillic: Брђани) is a village in the municipality of Konjic, Bosnia and Herzegovina.

== Demographics ==
According to the 2013 census, its population was 194.

Ethnicity in 2013
Ethnicity	Number	Percentage
Bosniaks	168	86.6%
Serbs	22	11.3%
Croats	1	0.5%
other/undeclared	3	1.5%
Total	194	100%
