= Čazma =

- Town
- Grad Čazma; Town of Čazma
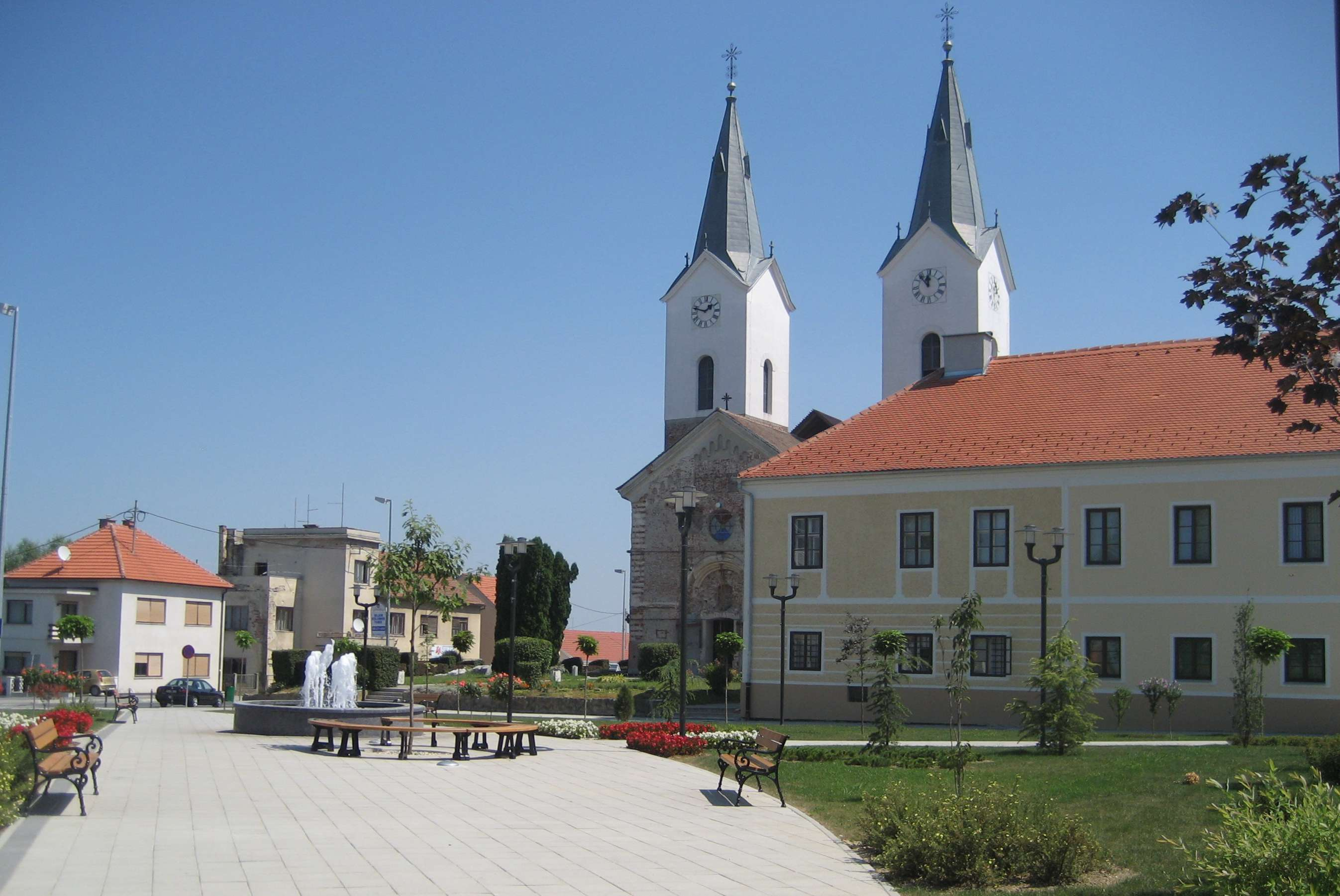
- Center of Čazma
- Interactive map of Čazma
- Location within Croatia
- Coordinates: 45°45′N 16°37′E
- Country: Croatia
- Region: Central Croatia (Moslavina)
- County: Bjelovar-Bilogora County

Government
  - Mayor: Valentina Čanađija (HSS)

Area
  - Town: 239.9 km^{2} (92.6 sq mi)
  - Urban: 8.5 km^{2} (3.3 sq mi)

Population (2021)
  - Town: 6,930
  - Density: 28.9/km^{2} (74.8/sq mi)
  - Urban: 2,417
  - Urban density: 280/km^{2} (740/sq mi)
- Time zone: UTC+1 (Central European Time)
- Website: cazma.hr

Čazma is a town in Bjelovar-Bilogora County, Croatia. It is part of Moslavina.

== Geography ==
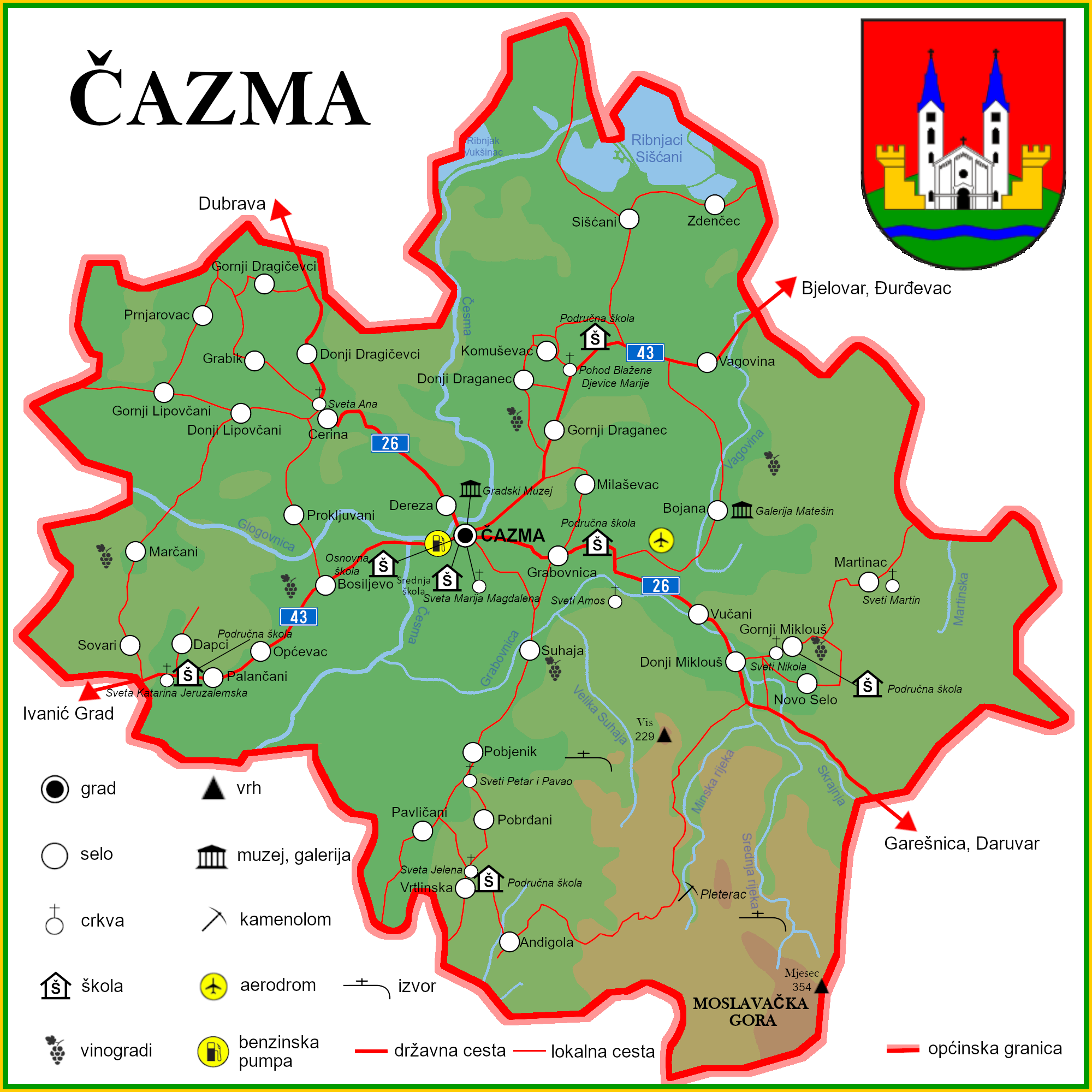
A map of Čazma (municipality)

Čazma is situated 60 kilometers east of Zagreb and only 30 kilometres from the center of the region - Bjelovar. Čazma is situated on the slopes of Moslavačka gora, surrounded by fertile lowlands. The river Česma runs to the east of Čazma and the smaller river Glogovnica flows into it nearby, too.

== Climate ==
Since records began in 1981, the highest temperature recorded at the local weather station was 38.8 °C (101.8 °F), on 24 August 2012. The coldest temperature was −22.3 °C (−8.1 °F), on 12 January 1985.

== History ==
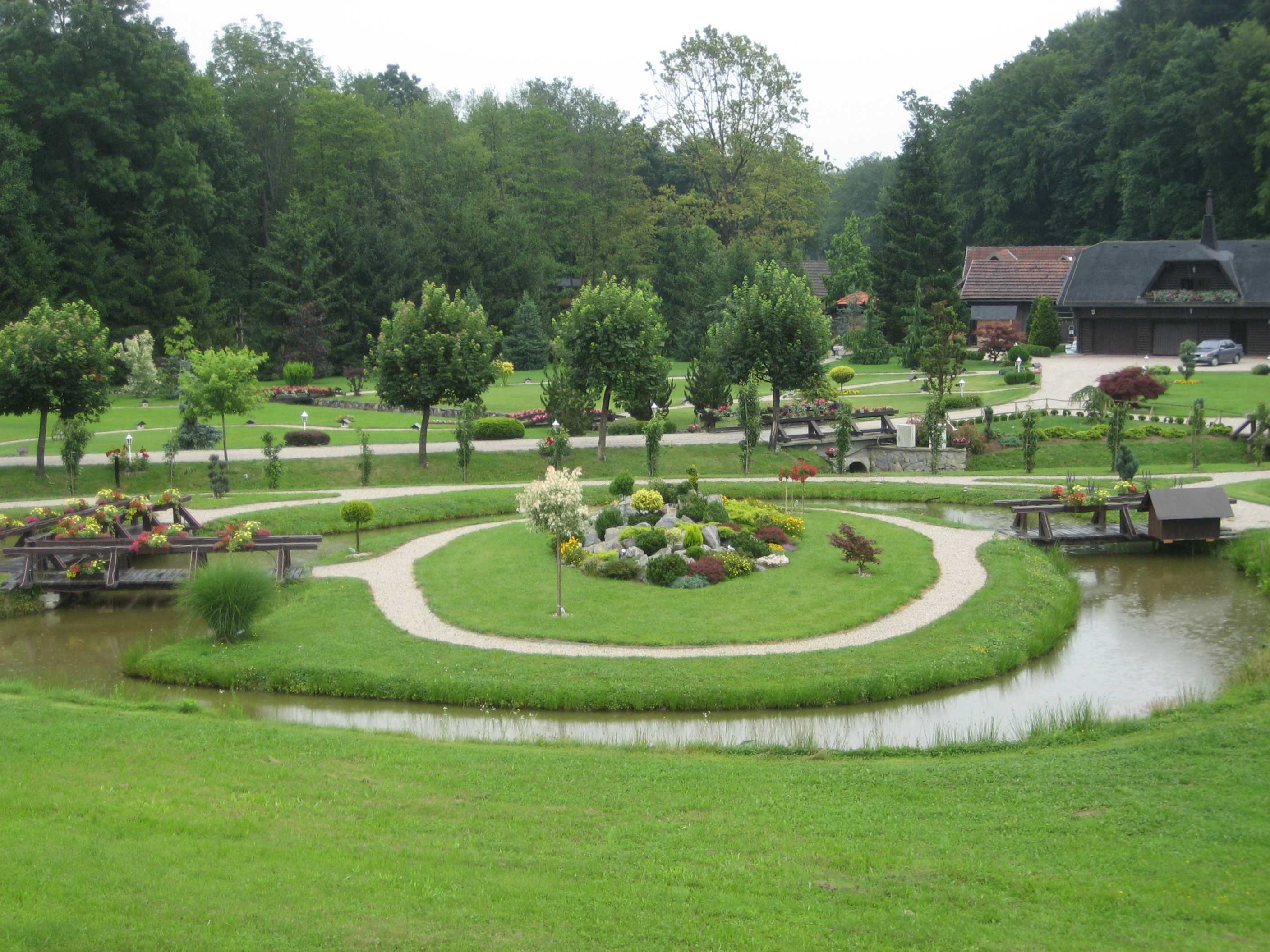
Tourist resort in Grabovnica

The town of Čazma is one of the oldest towns in the Republic of Croatia. It was mentioned in 1094, when the Hungarian king Ladislav gave Čazma as a possession to the bishop of Zagreb. The year that is mentioned as the year of Čazma's foundation is 1226, when bishop Stjepan II Babonić established a parish, built a Dominican monastery and - today far known for its cultural worth, the Church of saint Mary Magdalene, which gave the parish its present name. The church is the only preserved monument of the earliest written eight hundred-year history of the city. It is a unique example of romanic architecture in northern Croatia and experts equate its value with the Zagreb cathedral. The church organ made in 1767 are one of the most beautiful in Croatia.

Janus Pannonius (Latin: Ioannes Pannonius, Croatian: Ivan Česmički, Hungarian: Csezmiczei János, or Kesencei; 29 August 1434 – 27 March 1472) was born here who was a Croat-Hungarian Latinist, poet, diplomat and Bishop of Pécs. He was the most significant poet of the Renaissance in the Kingdom of Hungary and one of the better-known figures of Humanist poetry in Europe.

The town was occupied by the Ottoman Turks in 1552, who established their sanjak there. The town stayed under Ottoman rule for 54 years until it was liberated by Croatian Ban Toma Bakač Erdedi and his army in 1606.

In the late 19th and early 20th century, Čazma was a district capital in the Bjelovar-Križevci County of the Kingdom of Croatia-Slavonia.

== Economy ==
Its economy is based on small and middle-sized companies which manufacture final products from natural goods. Tradespeople, together with agricultural manufacturers, direct their development to services, production and tourist potential.

Half of the region where the town of Čazma is situated spreads out on agricultural land and as much as 44 percent is forested. Mineral wealth in the soil: quartz-sand, clay, stone etc., and especially springs of drinking water of great quality, enable various investments and building of plants, operation facilities and production lines.

The best known company from Čazma is Čazmatrans (transport company), which was established 1949.

== Demographics ==
In 2021 the town proper had a population of 2,417. The municipality of 36 villages was inhabited by a total of 6,930 people.

- Andigola
- Bojana
- Bosiljevo
- Cerina
- Dapci
- Dereza
- Donji Draganec
- Donji Dragičevci
- Donji Lipovčani
- Donji Miklouš
- Gornji Draganec
- Gornji Dragičevci
- Gornji Lipovčani
- Gornji Miklouš
- Grabik
- Grabovnica
- Komuševac
- Marčani
- Martinac
- Milaševac
- Novo Selo
- Općevac
- Palančani
- Pavličani
- Pobjenik
- Pobrđani
- Prnjarovac
- Prokljuvani
- Sišćani
- Sovari
- Suhaja
- Vagovina
- Vrtlinska
- Vučani
- Zdenčec

According to the 2011 census, 98% of the population are Croats.

Town of Čazma: Population trends 1857–2021
v

population	7412	7637	8310	9196	10459	11286	10925	12381	12365	12636	11160	9745	9284	8862	8895	8077	6930
	1857	1869	1880	1890	1900	1910	1921	1931	1948	1953	1961	1971	1981	1991	2001	2011	2021

Sources: Croatian Bureau of Statistics publications
