= Kutinska Slatina =

- Village
- Location within Croatia
- Coordinates: 45°31′N 16°47′E
- Country: Croatia
- County: Sisak-Moslavina County
- Municipality: Kutina

Area
  - Total: 4.6 km^{2} (1.8 sq mi)

Population (2021)
  - Total: 508
  - Density: 110/km^{2} (290/sq mi)
- Time zone: UTC+1 (CET)
  - Summer (DST): UTC+2 (CEST)

Kutinska Slatina is a village in Croatia.
