= Koritna, Zagreb County =

Coordinates: 45°51′50″N 16°30′07″E

Koritna
- Village
- Interactive map of Koritna
- Country: Croatia
- County: Zagreb County

Area
  - Total: 5.0 km^{2} (1.9 sq mi)

Population (2021)
  - Total: 160
  - Density: 32/km^{2} (83/sq mi)
- Time zone: UTC+1 (CET)
  - Summer (DST): UTC+2 (CEST)

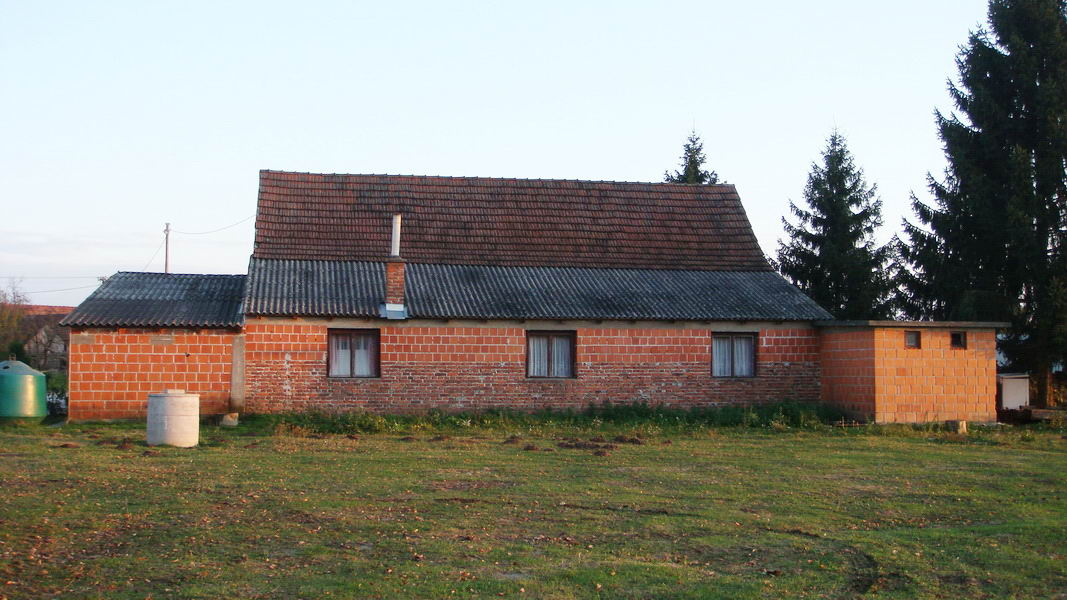
Koritna Community center, 2009

Koritna is a village in Croatia. It is connected by the D26 highway.
