= Pobrđani, Bjelovar-Bilogora County =

Pobrđani
- Village
- Location within Croatia
- Coordinates: 45.6947985°N 16.6136514°E
- Country: Croatia
- County: Bjelovar-Bilogora County
- Municipality: Čazma

Area
  - Total: 1.1 sq mi (2.9 km^{2})

Population (2021)
  - Total: 12
  - Density: 11/sq mi (4.1/km^{2})
- Time zone: UTC+1 (CET)
  - Summer (DST): UTC+2 (CEST)

Pobrđani is a village in Croatia.

== Demographics ==
According to the 2021 census, its population was 33.
