= Veliko Vukovje =

- Village
- Location within Croatia
- Country: Croatia
- County: Bjelovar-Bilogora County
- Municipality: Garešnica

Area
  - Total: 3.2 sq mi (8.4 km^{2})

Population (2021)
  - Total: 187
  - Density: 58/sq mi (22/km^{2})
- Time zone: UTC+1 (CET)
  - Summer (DST): UTC+2 (CEST)

Veliko Vukovje is a village in Croatia.

== Demographics ==
According to the 2021 census, its population was 187.
