= Prokljuvani, Čazma =

Prokljuvani
- Village
- Location within Croatia
- Coordinates: 45.7544165°N 16.5558012°E
- Country: Croatia
- County: Bjelovar-Bilogora County
- Municipality: Čazma

Area
  - Total: 1.3 sq mi (3.3 km^{2})

Population (2021)
  - Total: 41
  - Density: 32/sq mi (12/km^{2})
- Time zone: UTC+1 (CET)
  - Summer (DST): UTC+2 (CEST)

Prokljuvani is a village in Croatia.

== Demographics ==
According to the 2021 census, its population was 41.
