= Dežanovac =

- Municipality
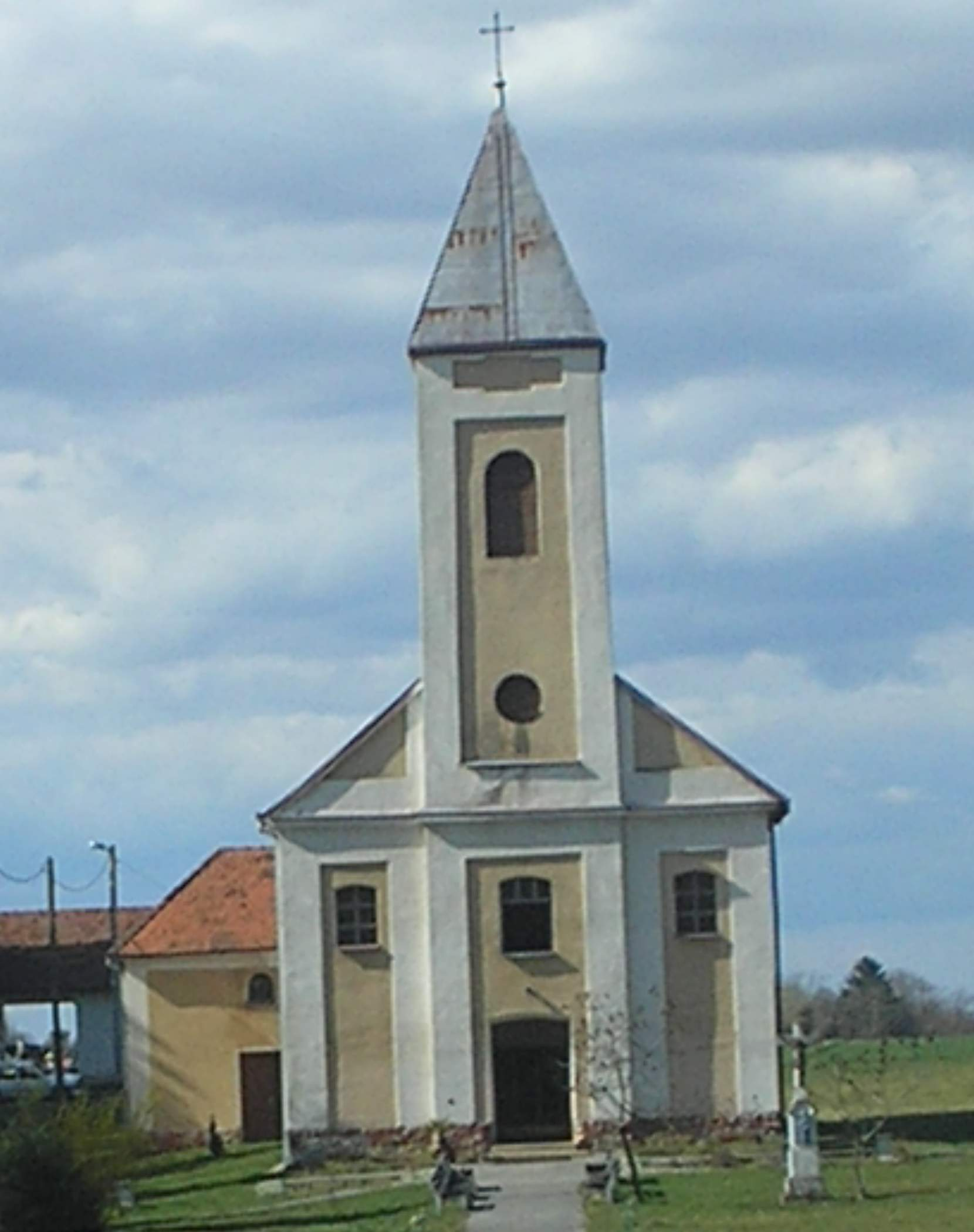
- The church of Saint Bartolomew in Dezanovac
- Interactive map of Dežanovac
- Location within Croatia
- Country: Croatia
- County: Bjelovar-Bilogora County

Government
  - Mayor: Josip Stjepanovic (HDZ)

Area
  - Municipality: 102.7 km^{2} (39.7 sq mi)
  - Urban: 16.4 km^{2} (6.3 sq mi)

Population (2021)
  - Municipality: 1,978
  - Density: 19.26/km^{2} (49.88/sq mi)
  - Urban: 608
  - Urban density: 37.1/km^{2} (96.0/sq mi)
- Time zone: UTC+1 (CET)
  - Summer (DST): UTC+2 (CEST)
- Website: dezanovac.hr

Dežanovac (Czech: Dežanovec, German: Deschanowatz, Hungarian: Szentlélek) is a village and a municipality in Bjelovar-Bilogora County, Croatia.

== Demographics ==
According to the 2021 census, the population of the municipality was 1,978 with 608 living in the town proper. There were 2,715 inhabitants (2011). 58.9% of the population were Croats and 23.1% Czechs.

The municipality consists of the following settlements:

- Blagorodovac, population 155
- Dežanovac, population 608
- Donji Sređani, population 139
- Drlež, population 11
- Golubinjak, population 117
- Gornji Sređani, population 198
- Goveđe Polje, population 73
- Ivanovo Polje, population 170
- Kaštel Dežanovački, population 36
- Kreštelovac, population 75
- Sokolovac, population 176
- Trojeglava, population 220
Dežanovac: Population trends 1857–2021
v

population	2283	4269	4920	6011	6199	6558	6430	6790	6793	6845	6082	5008	4121	3675	3355	2715	1978
	1857	1869	1880	1890	1900	1910	1921	1931	1948	1953	1961	1971	1981	1991	2001	2011	2021

Sources: Croatian Bureau of Statistics publications

== Politics ==
=== Minority councils and representatives ===
Although though the Government of the Republic of Croatia does not guarantee official Croatian-Czech bilinguialism here, the statute of Dežanovac itself does.

Directly elected minority councils and representatives are tasked with consulting tasks for the local or regional authorities in which they are advocating for minority rights and interests, integration into public life and participation in the management of local affairs. At the 2023 Croatian national minorities councils and representatives elections Czechs, Hungarians and Serbs of Croatia fulfilled legal requirements to elect their own 10 members minority councils of the Municipality of Dežanovac.
