= Šartovac =

Coordinates: 45°31′N 16°48′E

- Village
- Interactive map of Šartovac
- Country: Croatia
- County: Sisak-Moslavina County

Area
  - Total: 8.0 km^{2} (3.1 sq mi)

Population (2021)
  - Total: 318
  - Density: 40/km^{2} (100/sq mi)
- Time zone: UTC+1 (CET)
  - Summer (DST): UTC+2 (CEST)

Šartovac is a village in Croatia. It is connected by the D45 highway.
