= Zgališće =

Coordinates: 45°50′56″N 16°37′01″E

- Village
- Interactive map of Zgališće
- Country: Croatia
- County: Zagreb County

Area
  - Total: 1.7 km^{2} (0.66 sq mi)

Population (2021)
  - Total: 216
  - Density: 130/km^{2} (330/sq mi)
- Time zone: UTC+1 (CET)
  - Summer (DST): UTC+2 (CEST)

Zgališće is a village in Croatia. It is connected by the D26 highway.
