= Velika Bršljanica =

- Village
- Location within Croatia
- Coordinates: 45.589455°N 16.8107252°E
- Country: Croatia
- County: Bjelovar-Bilogora County
- Municipality: Garešnica

Area
  - Total: 4.2 sq mi (10.8 km^{2})

Population (2021)
  - Total: 155
  - Density: 37.2/sq mi (14.4/km^{2})
- Time zone: UTC+1 (CET)
  - Summer (DST): UTC+2 (CEST)

Velika Bršljanica is a village in Croatia.

== Demographics ==
According to the 2021 census, its population was 155.
