= Grabik, Croatia =

Grabik
- Village
- Location within Croatia
- Coordinates: 45.7866254°N 16.5485452°E
- Country: Croatia
- County: Bjelovar-Bilogora County
- Municipality: Čazma

Area
  - Total: 0.54 sq mi (1.4 km^{2})

Population (2021)
  - Total: 55
  - Density: 100/sq mi (39/km^{2})
- Time zone: UTC+1 (CET)
  - Summer (DST): UTC+2 (CEST)

Grabik is a village in Croatia.

== Demographics ==
According to the 2021 census, its population was 55.
