= Gornji Uljanik =

- Village
- Location within Croatia
- Coordinates: 45.5425203°N 17.0294141°E
- Country: Croatia
- County: Bjelovar-Bilogora County
- Municipality: Garešnica

Area
  - Total: 2.2 sq mi (5.7 km^{2})

Population (2021)
  - Total: 83
  - Density: 38/sq mi (15/km^{2})
- Time zone: UTC+1 (CET)
  - Summer (DST): UTC+2 (CEST)

Gornji Uljanik is a village in Croatia.

== Demographics ==
According to the 2021 census, its population was 83.
