= Brđani, Tuzla =

Village in Bosnia and Herzegovina

Brđani
- Village
- Location within Bosnia and Herzegovina
- Coordinates: 44.5744631°N 18.6792019°E
- Country: Bosnia and Herzegovina
- Entity: Federation of Bosnia and Herzegovina
- Canton: Tuzla
- Municipality: Tuzla

Area
  - Total: 0.49 sq mi (1.27 km^{2})

Population (2013)
  - Total: 328
  - Density: 669/sq mi (258/km^{2})
- Time zone: UTC+1 (CET)
  - Summer (DST): UTC+2 (CEST)

Brđani is a village in the municipality of Tuzla, Tuzla Canton, Bosnia and Herzegovina.

== Demographics ==
According to the 2013 census, its population was 328.

Ethnicity in 2013
Ethnicity	Number	Percentage
Bosniaks	257	78.4%
Croats	66	20.1%
Serbs	1	0.3%
other/undeclared	4	1.2%
Total	328	100%
