= Rečica Kriška =

Coordinates: 45°40′N 16°35′E

- Village
- Interactive map of Rečica Kriška
- Country: Croatia
- County: Zagreb County

Area
  - Total: 20.8 km^{2} (8.0 sq mi)

Population (2021)
  - Total: 310
  - Density: 15/km^{2} (39/sq mi)
- Time zone: UTC+1 (CET)
  - Summer (DST): UTC+2 (CEST)

Rečica Kriška is a village in Croatia.
