= Kaniška Iva =

- Village
- Location within Croatia
- Country: Croatia
- County: Bjelovar-Bilogora County
- Municipality: Garešnica

Area
  - Total: 8.0 sq mi (20.7 km^{2})

Population (2021)
  - Total: 370
  - Density: 46/sq mi (18/km^{2})
- Time zone: UTC+1 (CET)
  - Summer (DST): UTC+2 (CEST)

Kaniška Iva is a village in Croatia.

== Demographics ==
According to the 2021 census, its population was 370.
