= Martinac, Čazma =

Martinac
- Village
- Location within Croatia
- Country: Croatia
- County: Bjelovar-Bilogora County
- Municipality: Čazma

Area
  - Total: 4.4 sq mi (11.5 km^{2})

Population (2021)
  - Total: 53
  - Density: 12/sq mi (4.6/km^{2})
- Time zone: UTC+1 (CET)
  - Summer (DST): UTC+2 (CEST)

Martinac is a village in Croatia.

== Demographics ==
According to the 2021 census, its population was 53.
