= Dereza, Bjelovar-Bilogora County =

Dereza
- Village
- Location within Croatia
- Coordinates: 45.7604418°N 16.5701206°E
- Country: Croatia
- County: Bjelovar-Bilogora County
- Municipality: Čazma

Area
  - Total: 2.1 sq mi (5.5 km^{2})

Population (2021)
  - Total: 194
  - Density: 91/sq mi (35/km^{2})
- Time zone: UTC+1 (CET)
  - Summer (DST): UTC+2 (CEST)

Dereza is a village in Croatia.

== Demographics ==
According to the 2021 census, its population was 194.
