= Ladina =

Coordinates: 45°51′N 16°31′E

- Village
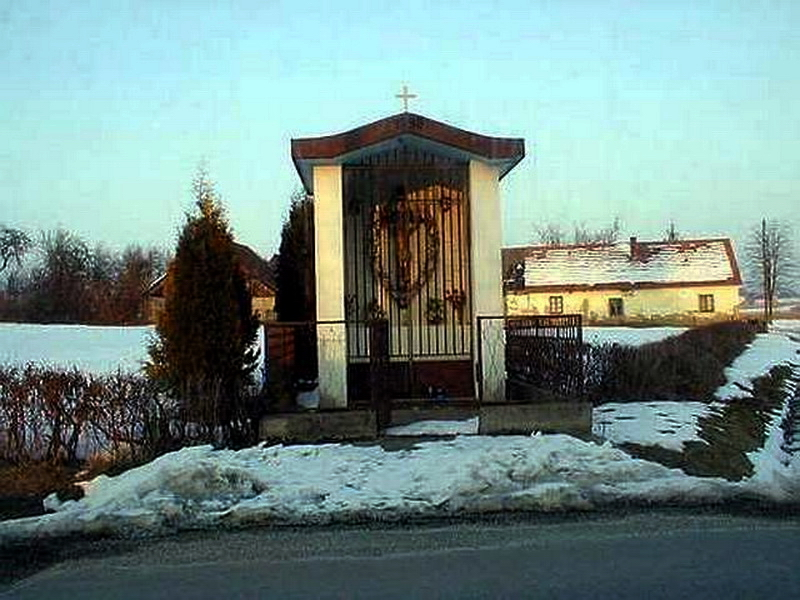
- Ladina - Raspelo
- Interactive map of Ladina
- Country: Croatia

Area
  - Total: 0.66 sq mi (1.7 km^{2})

Population (2021)
  - Total: 76
  - Density: 120/sq mi (45/km^{2})
- Time zone: UTC+1 (CET)
  - Summer (DST): UTC+2 (CEST)

Ladina is a village in Croatia. It is connected by the D26 highway.
