= Dišnik =

- Village
- Location within Croatia
- Country: Croatia
- County: Bjelovar-Bilogora County
- Municipality: Garešnica

Area
  - Total: 8.9 sq mi (23.1 km^{2})

Population (2021)
  - Total: 320
  - Density: 36/sq mi (14/km^{2})
- Time zone: UTC+1 (CET)
  - Summer (DST): UTC+2 (CEST)

Dišnik is a village in Croatia. It is situated northeast of Velika Bršljanica.

== Demographics ==
According to the 2021 census, its population was 320.
