= Ladislav, Croatia =

Ladislav
- Village
- Location within Croatia
- Country: Croatia
- County: Bjelovar-Bilogora County
- Municipality: Hercegovac

Area
  - Total: 4.6 sq mi (11.8 km^{2})

Population (2021)
  - Total: 289
  - Density: 63.4/sq mi (24.5/km^{2})
- Time zone: UTC+1 (CET)
  - Summer (DST): UTC+2 (CEST)

Ladislav is a village in Croatia.

== Demographics ==
According to the 2021 census, its population was 289. It was 367 in 2011.
