= Marčani =

- Village
- Location within Croatia
- Country: Croatia
- County: Bjelovar-Bilogora County
- Municipality: Čazma

Area
  - Total: 2.4 sq mi (6.2 km^{2})

Population (2021)
  - Total: 89
  - Density: 37/sq mi (14/km^{2})
- Time zone: UTC+1 (CET)
  - Summer (DST): UTC+2 (CEST)

Marčani is a village in Croatia.

== Demographics ==
According to the 2021 census, its population was 89.
