= FK Hercegovac =

FK Hercegovac may refer to:

- FK Hercegovac Bileća, a football club based in Bileća, Republika Srpska, Bosnia and Herzegovina
- FK Hercegovac Gajdobra, a football club based in Gajdobra, municipality of Bačka Palanka, Vojvodina, Serbia
