= Hercegovac, Croatia =

Hercegovac
- Municipality
- Interactive map of Hercegovac
- Location within Croatia
- Country: Croatia
- County: Bjelovar-Bilogora County

Government
  - Mayor: Boro Bašljan (HSS)

Area
  - Municipality: 19.5 sq mi (50.6 km^{2})
  - Urban: 6.1 sq mi (15.9 km^{2})

Population (2021)
  - Municipality: 1,910
  - Density: 97.8/sq mi (37.7/km^{2})
  - Urban: 857
  - Urban density: 140/sq mi (53.9/km^{2})
- Time zone: UTC+1 (CET)
  - Summer (DST): UTC+2 (CEST)
- Website: opcinahercegovac.hr

Hercegovac (Czech: Hercegovec, German: Herzogsturn, Hungarian: Szentkirály), is a village and a municipality in Bjelovar-Bilogora County, Croatia. In 2001 there were 2,791 inhabitants, of which 87% were Croats.

== Demographics ==
In 2021, the municipality had 1,910 residents in the following settlements:

- Hercegovac, population 857
- Ilovski Klokočevac, population 126
- Ladislav, population 289
- Palešnik, population 391
- Velika Trnava, population 247
Hercegovac: Population trends 1857–2021
v

population	3054	2974	2772	3686	3795	3892	3945	4013	3838	3842	3790	3498	3186	3143	2791	2383	1910
	1857	1869	1880	1890	1900	1910	1921	1931	1948	1953	1961	1971	1981	1991	2001	2011	2021

Sources: Croatian Bureau of Statistics publications

== Politics ==
=== Minority councils and representatives ===
Directly elected minority councils and representatives are tasked with consulting tasks for the local or regional authorities in which they are advocating for minority rights and interests, integration into public life and participation in the management of local affairs. At the 2023 Croatian national minorities councils and representatives elections Czechs of Croatia fulfilled legal requirements to elect 10 members minority council of the Municipality of Hercegovac but the elections were not organized due to the lack of candidates.

== History ==
In the late 19th and early 20th century, Hercegovac was part of the Bjelovar-Križevci County of the Kingdom of Croatia-Slavonia.
