= Međurić =

Coordinates: 45°27′N 16°55′E

- Village
- Interactive map of Međurić
- Country: Croatia

Area
  - Total: 3.9 sq mi (10.1 km^{2})

Population (2021)
  - Total: 427
  - Density: 109/sq mi (42.3/km^{2})
- Time zone: UTC+1 (CET)
  - Summer (DST): UTC+2 (CEST)

Međurić is a village in Croatia. Međurić is known as Mezurač in Czech.
