= Moslavačka gora =

Mountain in Central Croatia

Coordinates: 45°36′45″N 16°45′00″E

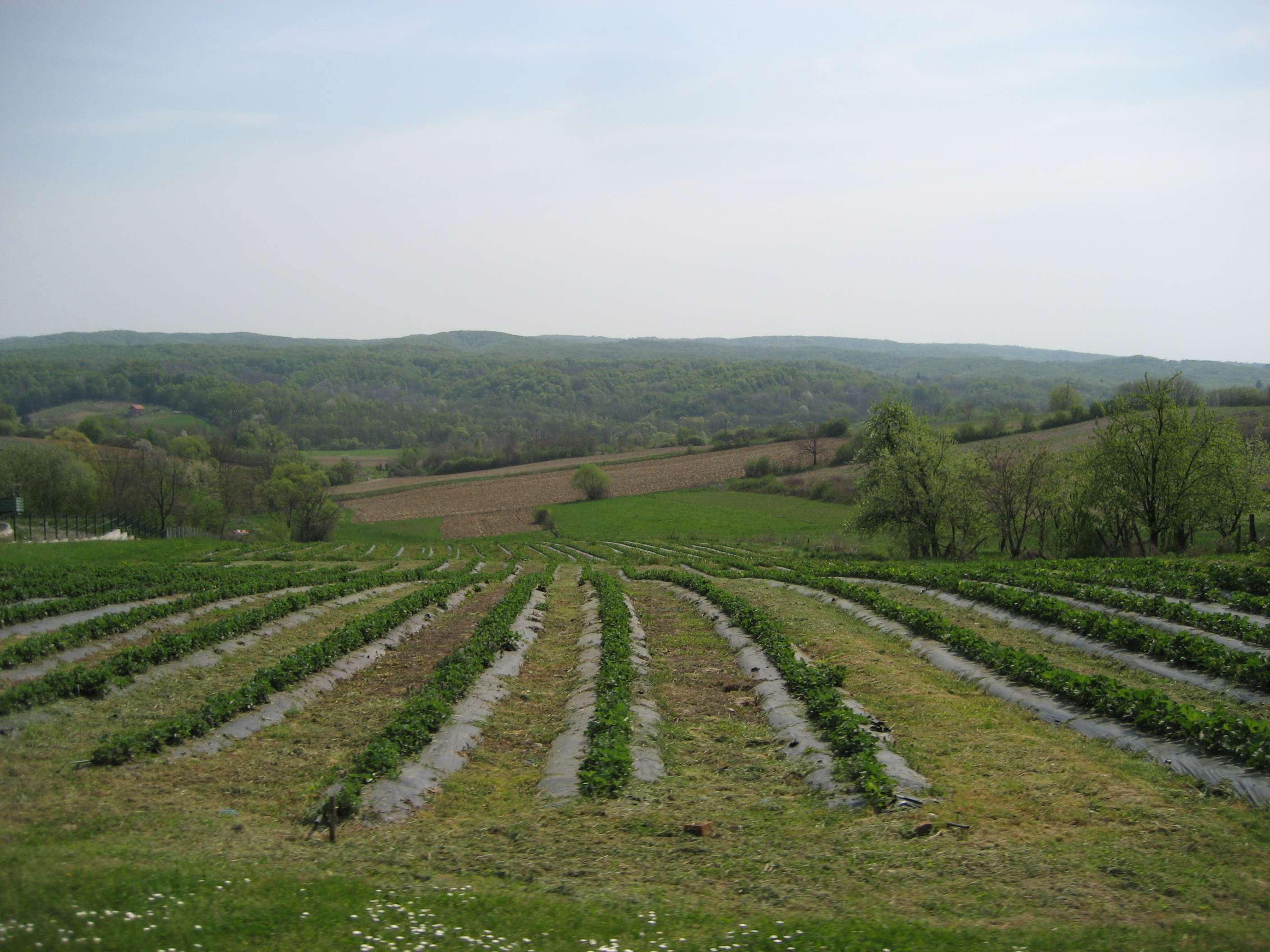
Slopes of Moslavačka Gora at Vrtlinska

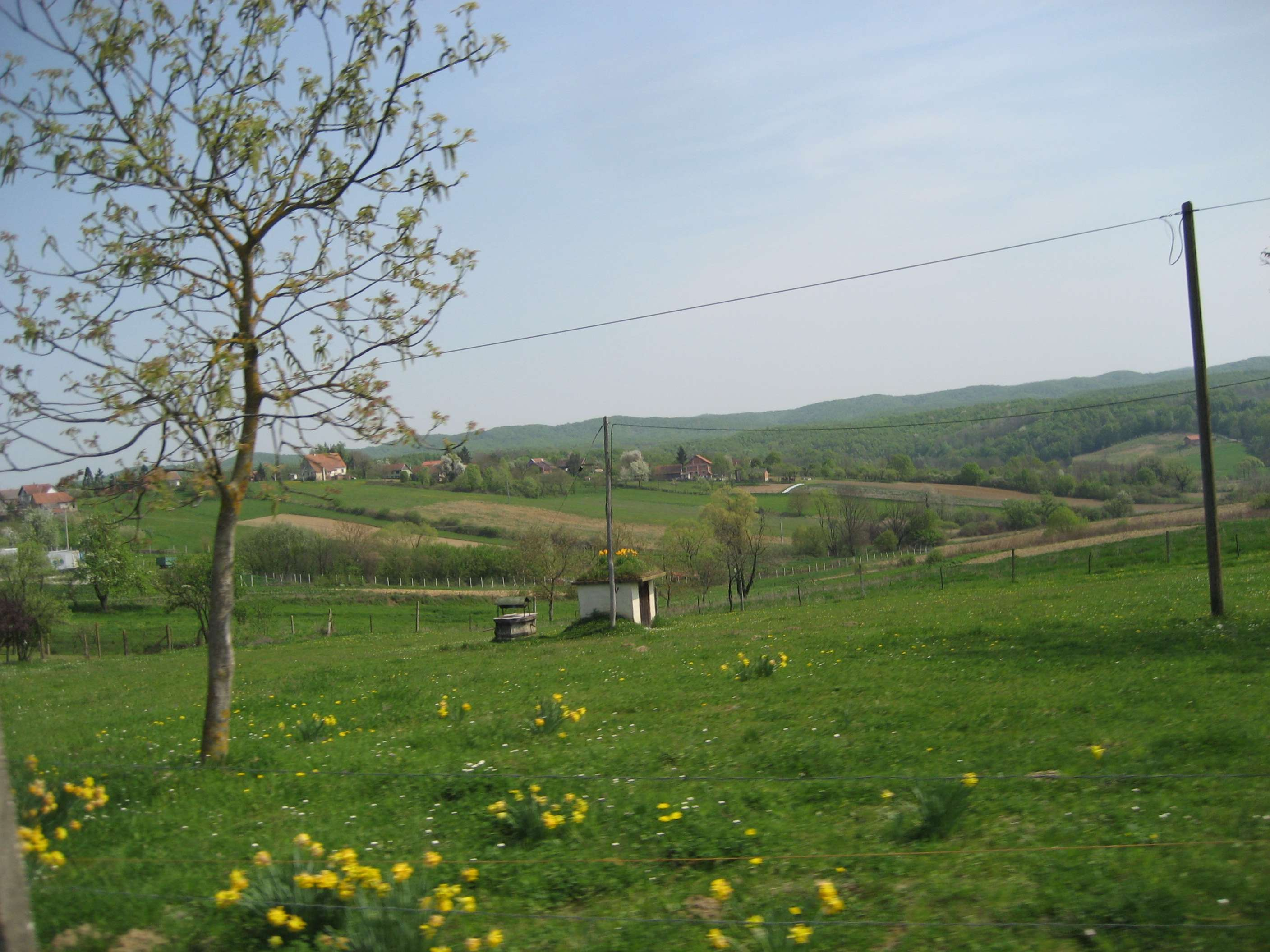
Slopes of Moslavačka Gora at Pobjenik

Moslavačka Gora is a small mountain located in Central Croatia at the borders of Bjelovar-Bilogora County and Sisak–Moslavina County. They belong to the sunken boulder Highlands of palaeogeological origin, rich in mineral resources (granite, and oil and gas). The highest peak is Humka at 489 m. Other prominent peaks include Vis (444 m) Kaluđerov grob (437 m) and Mjesec (Moon) (354 m). The area of Moslavačka Gora is about 1350 km^{2}.

The Moslavačka mountains are covered with dense forests of beech, sessile oak, hornbeam, chestnut, black alder and birch, and in the lower regions there are cultivated orchards and vineyards. The southern slopes are particularly impressive.

Prehistoric elephants (such as Gomphotherium angustidens, Prodeinotherium bavaricum and rhinoceroses fossils (Brachypotherium brachypus) were found inside the oldest sediments in bentonite clay mine near the village Gornja Jelenska in 1994 around 17 million years and are among the oldest on the European continent. There are several quarries, some of them abandoned. The most important include Pleterac and Mikleuška.

Rare and endangered plants that grow here include: star sedge (Carex echinata) and Lesser Butterfly-orchid (Platanthera bifolia). In the watercourses live endangered fish such as the white chub (Leuciscus cavedanus), and amphibians include the fire Salamander, Agile Frog and Yellow-bellied toad.

In the Moslavačka Gora area, there are remains of ancient fortifications, of which the best known is Garić-grad, built by Ban Stjepan Šubić in 1256 AD.

The area has been protected since 2007, having been classified as a regional park.

Moslavačka Gora has very interesting geological features and rich geological heritage. Characteristic is the appearance of various igneous and metamorphic rocks in interesting structural relationships.

== Bibliography ==
=== Alpinism ===
- Poljak, Željko (February 1959). "Moslavačka gora". Kazalo za "Hrvatski planinar" i "Naše planine" 1898—1958 (PDF). Naše planine. Vol. XI. p. 6. ISSN 0354-0650.

=== Geology ===
- Lozić, Sanja; Fuerst-Bjeliš, Borna; Perica, Dražen (2006-06-01). "Quantitative-geomorphological and Environmental-historical Impact of the Ecological Soil Depth; Northwestern Croatia". Hrvatski geografski glasnik. 68 (1): 7–25. doi:10.21861/HGG.2006.68.01.01. eISSN 1848-6401.
