= Tomašica, Croatia =

Tomašica
- Village
- Location within Croatia
- Country: Croatia
- County: Bjelovar-Bilogora County
- Municipality: Garešnica

Area
  - Total: 5.2 sq mi (13.5 km^{2})

Population (2021)
  - Total: 308
  - Density: 59.1/sq mi (22.8/km^{2})
- Time zone: UTC+1 (CET)
  - Summer (DST): UTC+2 (CEST)

Tomašica is a village in Croatia.

== Demographics ==
According to the 2021 census, its population was 308. It was 365 according to the 2011 census.
