= D28 road (Croatia) =

State road in Croatia

D28 state road

Route information
- Length: 70.7 km (43.9 mi)

Major junctions
- From: D10 in Gradec interchange
- D22 in Sveti Ivan Žabno; D43 in Bjelovar
- To: D5 and D45 in Veliki Zdenci

Location
- Country: Croatia
- Counties: Zagreb County, Koprivnica-Križevci, Bjelovar-Bilogora
- Major cities: Bjelovar

Highway system
- Highways in Croatia

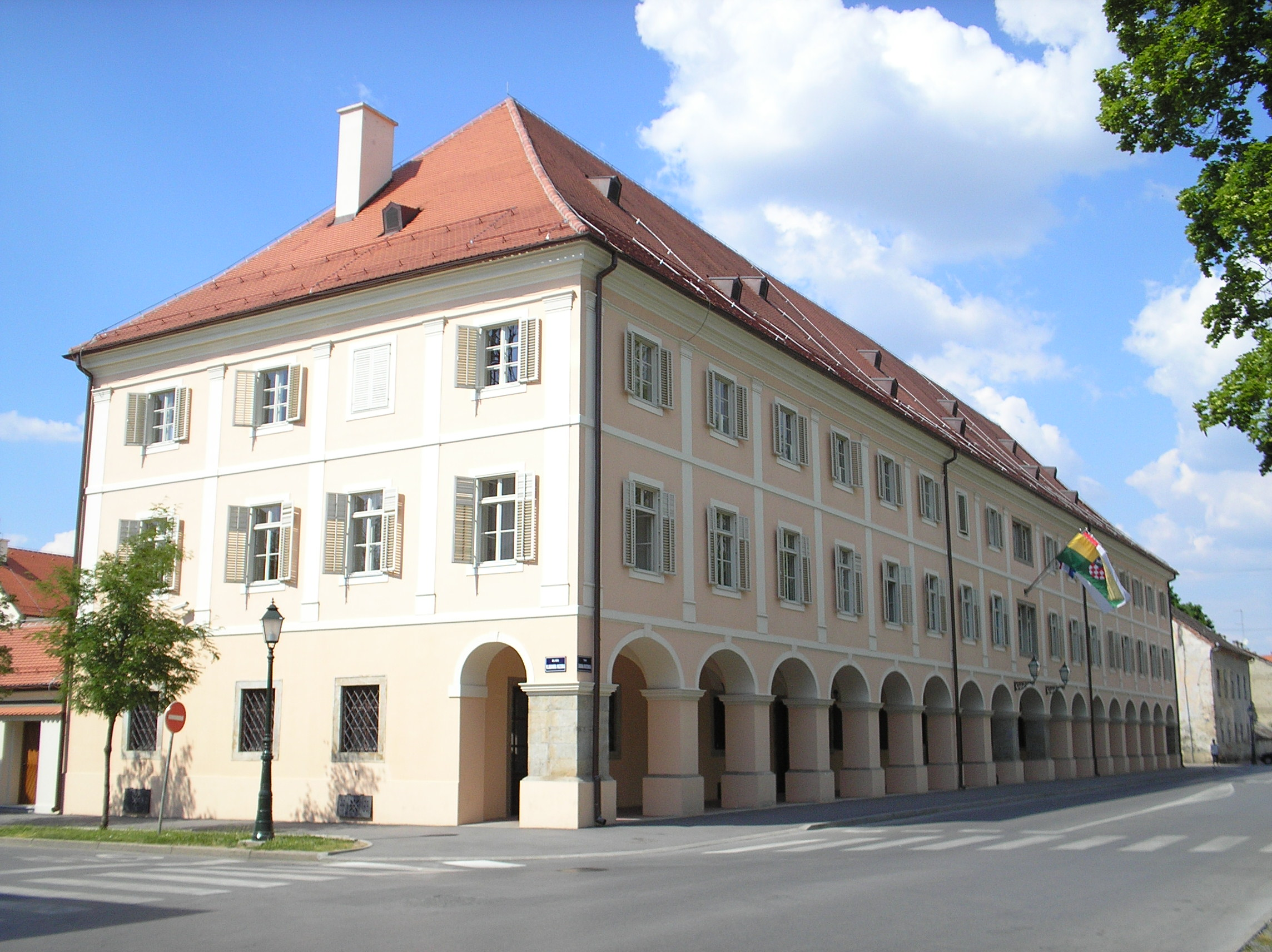
Bjelovar, on the D28 road route

D28 is a state road in central Croatia connecting the D5 and D45 in Veliki Zdenci to the D10 in Gradec interchange. The road is 70.7 km (43.9 mi) The road, as well as all other state roads in Croatia, is managed and maintained by Hrvatske ceste, a state-owned company.

== Traffic volume ==
Traffic is regularly counted and reported by Hrvatske ceste, one of the operators of the road.

D28 traffic volume
Road	Counting site	AADT	ASDT	Notes
D28	2103 Sveti Ivan Žabno	6,654	6,833	Between the Ž3041 and Ž2229 junctions.
D28	2102 Predavac	8,385	8,477	Between the Ž3022 and Ž3300 junctions.
D28	2104 Bjelovar bypass	3,529	4,105	Between the Ž3022 and D43 junctions.
D28	2106 Prespa	5,258	5,254	Between the Ž3048 and Ž3087 junctions.
D28	2110 Bulinac	2,621	2,798	Between the Ž3090 and Ž3280 junctions.

== Road junctions and populated areas ==
D28 junctions/populated areas
Type	Slip roads/Notes
	Gradec interchange D10 to A4 motorway Sveta Helena interchange (to the south) and to Križevci (D22) (to the north). Ž3025 to Vrbovec (D41). The western terminus of the road.
	Cugovec; Ž2211 to Poljana Križevačka and Cubinec (D22) (to the north) and Dubrava (D26) (to the south).
	Haganj; Ž3041 to Dubrava, Ivanić Grad and Veleševec.
	Škrinjari
	Sveti Ivan Žabno; D22 to Križevci and Novi Marof (D3). Ž2229 to Brezovljani. Ž2230 to Cirkvena.
	Kuštani
	Kenđelovec; Ž2231 to Cirkvena, Farkaševac and the D43 state road.
	Markovac Križevački
	Rovišće; Ž3003 to Kraljevac. Ž3020 to Tuk.
	Predavac; Ž3022 within the village. Ž3300 to Bjelovar.
	D43 to Đurđevac (D2) (to the north). To the south, the D28 road and the D43 are concurrent.
	Letičani
	Trojstveni Markovac
	Bjelovar; D43 to Čazma and the A3 motorway Ivanić Grad interchange (to the south). To the north, the D28 road and the D43 are concurrent.
	Ždralovi
	Prespa
	Severin; Ž3029 to Kašljavac (to the north) and to Dautan, Međurača and Nova Ploščica (to the south).
	Bulinac; Ž2232 to Šandrovac, Suha Katalena and Budančevica (D2). Ž3090 to Nova Rača, Velika Trnovitica and Veliki Pasijan (D26).
	Drljanovac; Ž3280 to Nova Rača.
	Ž4002 to Velika Pisanica, Velika Črešnjevica and Pitomača (D2).
	Veliki Grđevac; Ž3092 to Donja Kovačica, Slovinska Kovačica and Orlovac. Ž3093 to Gornja Kovačica and Velika Barna. Ž3094 to Grubišno Polje and Ivanovo Selo.
	Pavlovac; Ž3133 to Ladislav and to (D45). Ž3282 to Dražica and Orlovac.
	Veliki Zdenci; D5 to Daruvar, Pakrac and the A3 motorway Okučani interchange (to the south) and to Virovitica (D2) (to the north). D45 to Garešnica and A3 motorway Kutina interchange. The eastern terminus of the road.
