= Račačka =

Račačka Račačka rijeka

Location
- Country: Croatia

Physical characteristics
- Source
  - location: Babinac, Velika Pisanica
- Mouth: Česma
  - coordinates: 45°45′24″N 16°54′25″E

Basin features
- Progression: Česma→ Lonja→ Sava→ Danube→ Black Sea

Račačka or Račačka rijeka is a river in Central Croatia and a right tributary of the Česma river. Most of its course flows through the municipality of Nova Rača. It originates at the confluence of the Grebenska and Bačkovica streams, whose sources are on the slopes of Bilogora. Račačka is rich in fish.

== Description ==
Račačka flows through the following settlements: Babinac, Bedenik, Drljanovac, Bulinac, Stara Rača, Nova Rača, Tociljevac, Kozarevac Račanski until it flows into the Česma river by Sasovac.

== Fishing ==
Račačka is rich in fish caught as part of sport fishing. Some of the main types of fish are: catfish, carp, pike, flounder, perch, etc. The largest pond in the area of Račačka is the Ivankovac artificial lakes in the western part of Nova Rača, the ponds are owned by ŠRD "Štuka" Nova Rača.
