= Sveti Ivan Žabno =

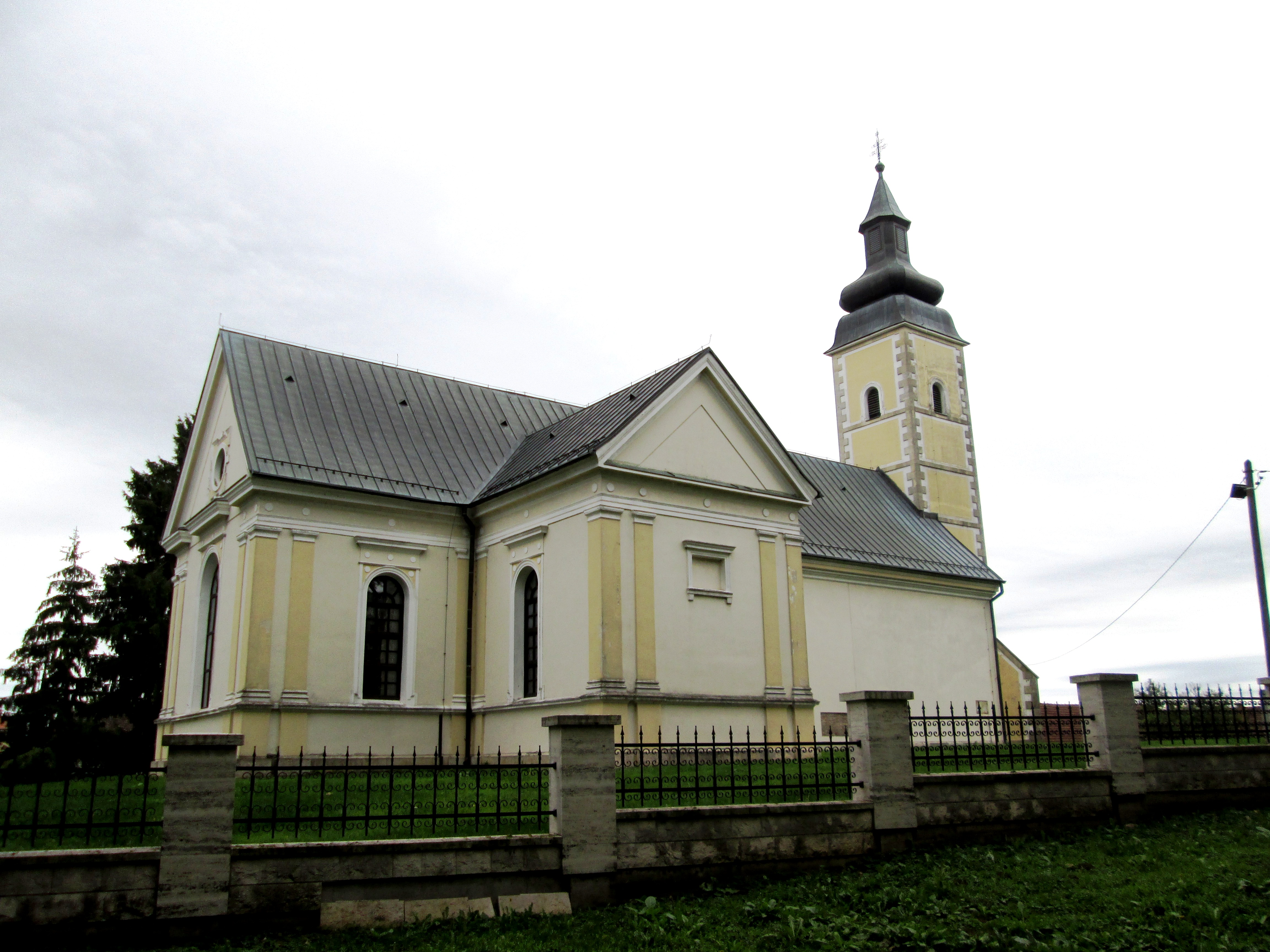
- St. John Baptist Church in Sveti Ivan Zabno, Croatia
- Interactive map of Sveti Ivan Žabno
- Location within Croatia
- Coordinates: 45°57′N 16°37′E
- Country: Croatia
- County: Koprivnica-Križevci County

Government
  - Mayor: Nenad Bošnjak (Independent)

Area
  - Total: 106.1 km^{2} (41.0 sq mi)

Population (2021)
  - Total: 4,343
  - Density: 40.93/km^{2} (106.0/sq mi)
- Time zone: UTC+1 (CET)
  - Summer (DST): UTC+2 (CEST)
- Postal code: 48214 Sveti Ivan Žabno
- Website: osiz.hr

Sveti Ivan Žabno is a settlement and a municipality in the Koprivnica-Križevci County in Croatia. According to the 2021 census, the municipality had 4,343 inhabitants.

== History ==
In the late 19th century and early 20th century, Sveti Ivan Žabno was part of the Bjelovar-Križevci County of the Kingdom of Croatia-Slavonia, Austria-Hungary.

== Demographics ==
In 2021, the municipality had 4,343 residents in the following 16 settlements:

- Brdo Cirkvensko, population 127
- Brezovljani, population 274
- Cepidlak, population 146
- Cirkvena, population 507
- Hrsovo, population 219
- Kenđelovec, population 162
- Kuštani, population 78
- Ladinec, population 129
- Markovac Križevački, population 127
- Novi Glog, population 129
- Predavec Križevački, population 96
- Rašćani, population 97
- Sveti Ivan Žabno, population 1,049
- Sveti Petar Čvrstec, population 437
- Škrinjari, population 182
- Trema, population 584
Sveti Ivan Žabno: Population trends 1857–2021
v

population	5070	4996	5020	6104	7088	7577	7317	7775	8492	8577	8416	7624	6617	6000	5628	5222	4343
	1857	1869	1880	1890	1900	1910	1921	1931	1948	1953	1961	1971	1981	1991	2001	2011	2021

Sources: Croatian Bureau of Statistics publications

== Administration ==
The current mayor of Sveti Ivan Žabno is Nenad Bošnjak (Free Voters Group) and the Sveti Ivan Žabno Municipal Council consists of 13 seats.

Groups	Councilors per group
Free Voters Group	8 / 13
HDZ	3 / 13
SDP	1 / 13
Siniša Jandrijević	1 / 13
