= Drnek =

Drnek may refer to:

- Drnek, Czech Republic, a village near Kladno, Czech Republic
- Drnek, Croatia, a village near Orle, Croatia
