= Jasenik =

Jasenik may refer to the following places in Bosnia and Herzegovina:

- Jasenik, Gacko
- Jasenik, Konjic

and in Croatia:

- Jasenik, Šandrovac
