= Prespa (disambiguation) =

Prespa is a region shared between the Republic of North Macedonia, Albania and Greece.

Prespa may also refer to:

- Lake Prespa, two lakes on the border between North Macedonia, Albania and Greece
- Prespa (medieval town), an important medieval Bulgarian town
- Prespa (village), Bulgaria
- Prespa, Croatia, a village
- Prespa Glacier, Livingston Island, Antarctica
- Prespa Birlik, a Swedish football club from Malmö

== See also ==
- Prespes, a municipality in Greece
- The Prespa agreement, an agreement to resolve the Macedonia naming dispute
