= Praščevac =

- Village
- Location within Croatia
- Coordinates: 45°55.0561′N 16°38.8648′E
- Country: Croatia
- County: Zagreb County
- Municipality: Farkaševac

Area
  - Total: 3.2 km^{2} (1.2 sq mi)

Population (2021)
  - Total: 95
  - Density: 30/km^{2} (77/sq mi)
- Time zone: UTC+1 (CET)
  - Summer (DST): UTC+2 (CEST)

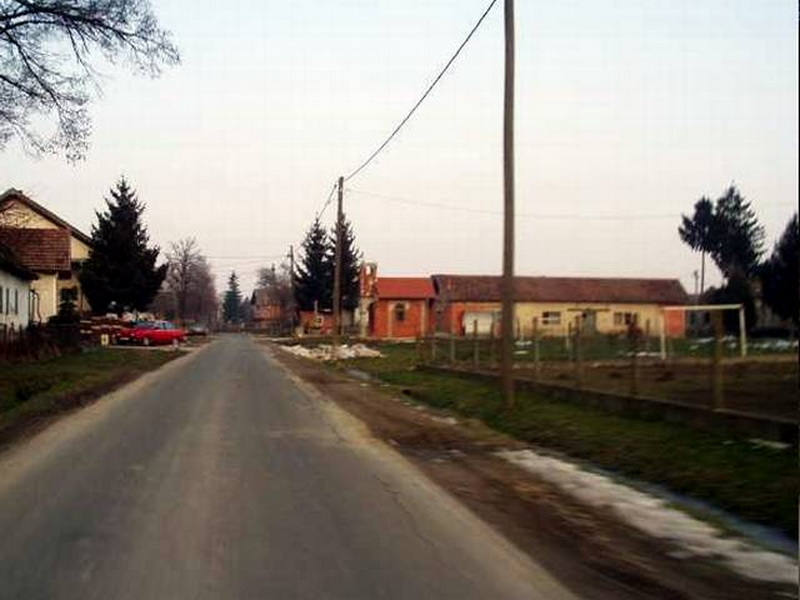
Praščevac’s Main Road

Praščevac is a village in Croatia. It is connected by the Ž2231 road with Farkaševac and Cirkvena.
