= Grabrić =

- Location within Croatia
- Coordinates: 45°54′3″N 16°30′19″E
- Country: Croatia
- County: Zagreb County
- Municipality: Gradec

Area
  - Total: 1.5 km^{2} (0.58 sq mi)

Population (2021)
  - Total: 84
  - Density: 56/km^{2} (150/sq mi)
- Time zone: UTC+1 (CET)
  - Summer (DST): UTC+2 (CEST)

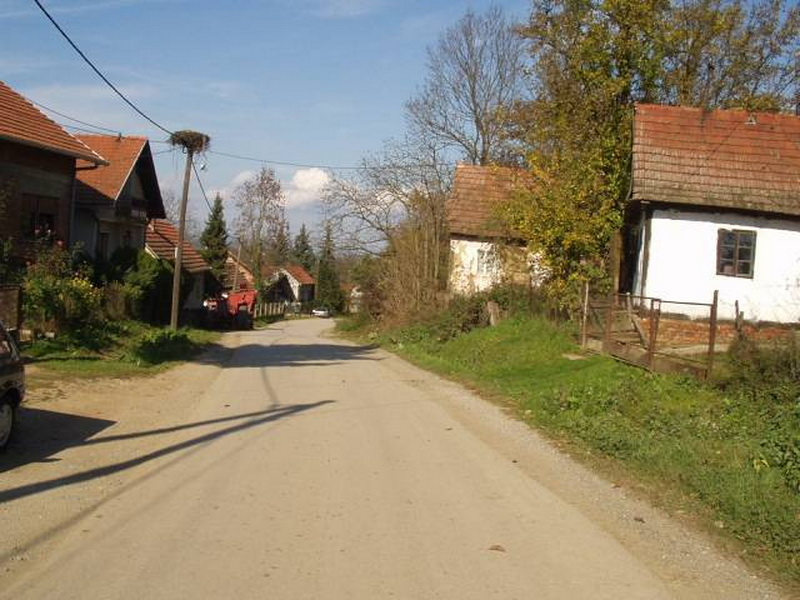
View of Haupt Strasse in Grabric

Grabrić is a census-designated naselje (settlement) in the Gradec municipality of Zagreb County, Croatia. It has 85 people according to the 2001 census. Expressways B28 and B41 have an interchange near Grabrić.
