= Žabnica =

Žabnica may refer to:

In Croatia:

- Žabnica, Croatia, a village in Zagreb County

In Slovenia:

- Žabnica, Kranj, a settlement in the Municipality of Kranj
- Žabnica, Brezovica, a settlement in the Municipality of Brezovica
