= Orlovac =

Orlovac may refer to:

- Orlovac, Serbia, a village near Kuršumlija
- Orlovac, Nova Rača, a village in Croatia
- Orlovac Zdenački, a village near Grubišno Polje, Croatia
- Orlovac, Karlovac, a section of the city of Karlovac, Croatia
- Orlovac Hydroelectric Power Plant, a hydroelectric power plant located in Croatia and Bosnia and Herzegovina
- Orlovac, one of the hamlets of Ropočevo, a settlement of Belgrade, Serbia
