= Lavoslav Singer =

Croatian industrialist

- Born: 1866; Bulinac, Kingdom of Croatia-Slavonia, Austria-Hungary
- Died: 1942 (aged 76); Auschwitz-Birkenau, German-occupied Poland
- Cause of death: Murdered in Holocaust
- Occupation: Industrialist
- Spouse: Amalia (née Herenshtein) Singer

Lavoslav Singer (1866–1942) was a Croatian industrialist notable for his role in the development of Bjelovar.

Singer was born in the village of Bulinac (part of Nova Rača), into a Croatian Jewish family of Josip (Yosef) Singer. He was educated at the best business schools in Austrian Empire. Upon completion of his education he was engaged in industrial revolution that led to the development of factories in Bjelovar. Singer developed the milling industry in Bjelovar, but was also active in the development of coal mining, gravel extraction from the river Drava and its shipment to the big cities, and has also extracted gold from Drava. Singer was one of the leading financiers and representative of concessionaires that built the railway Bjelovar-Garešnica/Grubišno Polje. He was one of the most important and wealthiest townsman of Bjelovar. Singer was married to Amalia (née Herenshtein) Singer. Being Jews, during World War II, Singer and his wife were forced to wear yellow star of David on their clothes. In 1942 Singer and his wife were arrested and deported to Auschwitz concentration camp where they were killed during the Holocaust. He was 76 years old.

== Bibliography ==
- Miodrag Savkovitch, Emerih Mike (1926). Zbirka portreta i biografija znamenitih ljudi kraljevstva Srba, Hrvata i Slovenaca. Vienna: Union - Stephen A. Schwarzman Building / Slavic and Baltic Division.
