= Lasovac =

- Village
- Location within Croatia
- Coordinates: 45.853109°N 17.0001185°E
- Country: Croatia
- County: Bjelovar-Bilogora County
- Municipality: Šandrovac

Area
  - Total: 3.6 sq mi (9.4 km^{2})

Population (2021)
  - Total: 441
  - Density: 120/sq mi (47/km^{2})
- Time zone: UTC+1 (CET)
  - Summer (DST): UTC+2 (CEST)

Lasovac is a village in Croatia.

== Demographics ==
According to the 2021 census, its population was 441.
