= Čađavac, Bjelovar-Bilogora County =

Čađavac
- Village
- Location within Croatia
- Coordinates: 45.8366501°N 17.0958622°E
- Country: Croatia
- County: Bjelovar-Bilogora County
- Municipality: Velika Pisanica

Area
  - Total: 1.8 sq mi (4.7 km^{2})

Population (2021)
  - Total: 41
  - Density: 23/sq mi (8.7/km^{2})
- Time zone: UTC+1 (CET)
  - Summer (DST): UTC+2 (CEST)

Čađavac is a village in Croatia.

== Demographics ==
According to the 2021 census, its population was 41.
