= Žabnica, Croatia =

Žabnica
- Village
- Location within Croatia
- Coordinates: 45°54.5285′N 16°36.8174′E
- Country: Croatia
- County: Zagreb County

Area
  - Total: 4.3 km^{2} (1.7 sq mi)

Population (2021)
  - Total: 130
  - Density: 30/km^{2} (78/sq mi)
- Time zone: UTC+1 (CET)
  - Summer (DST): UTC+2 (CEST)

Žabnica is a village in Croatia. It is connected by the D28 highway. It is surrounded by several villages : Haganj, Zvonik and Stara Kapela.
