= Žiga Hirschler =

Croatian-Jewish composer, music critic and publicist

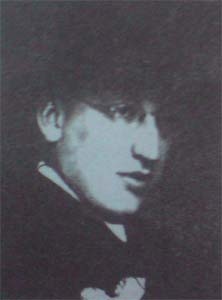
- Born: 21 March 1894; Velika Trnovitica, Kingdom of Hungary, Austro-Hungarian Empire, (now Croatia)
- Died: September 1941 (aged 47); Jasenovac concentration camp
- Cause of death: Murdered in Holocaust
- Occupations: Composer, music critic

Žiga Hirschler (21 March 1894, Velika Trnovitica near Bjelovar – 1941 Jasenovac concentration camp) was a Croatian-Jewish composer, music critic and publicist who was killed during the Holocaust.

== Life ==
Hirschler was born in Zagreb, to a Croatian Jewish family. He completed musical studies in 1917 at the Agram conservatory of the Croatian Music Institute in Zagreb.

Hirschler composed orchestral, piano, vocal and dramatic works, and showed a tendency towards popular music. He was one of the most famous music critics in Zagreb between the two world wars. Hirschler was editor of Musician magazine. With his writing in the Večernji vjesnik and Jutarnji list he closely followed Croatian composers.

As a Jew Hirschler faced persecution by Ustaše and Nazis. During the last days of his life, Hirschler didn't leave his apartment. He just had an intense correspondence with Paula Rendi, waiting for her to give him a pass so that he could cross over to a "free zone". That unfortunately never happened. Hirschler wrote his last letters on 12 September 1941. In one such letter, he dedicated a song to Rendi for her birthday. In late 1941 Hirschler was killed at the Jasenovac concentration camp.

== Works ==
=== Operas ===
- Dvije renesansne noći
  - Fiorentinska noć, 1926
  - Svadbena noć, 1931
- Mara

=== Operettas ===
- Pobjednica oceana, 1928
- Kaj nam pak moreju, 1935
- Napred naš, 1936
- Iz Zagreba u Zagreb, 1937

His Burlesk has been played on radio by Dan Franklin Smith but not recorded.

== Bibliography ==
- Kraus, Ognjen (1998). Dva stoljeća povijesti i kulture Židova u Zagrebu i Hrvatskoj. Zagreb: Židovska općina Zagreb. ISBN 953-96836-2-9.
- Knežević, Snješka; Laslo, Aleksander (2011). Židovski Zagreb. Zagreb: AGM, Židovska općina Zagreb. ISBN 978-953-174-393-8.
- Goldstein, Ivo (2005). Židovi u Zagrebu 1918 – 1941. Zagreb: Novi Liber. ISBN 953-6045-23-0.
- Goldstein, Ivo (2001). Holokaust u Zagrebu. Zagreb: Novi Liber. ISBN 953-6045-19-2.
- Pintar, Marijana, Hirschler, Žiga (Hiršler), u: Macan, Trpimir (ur.), Hrvatski biografski leksikon, Zagreb: Leksikografski zavod Miroslav Krleža, 1983., str. 580–581. (Croatian)
- Polić, Branko, Prekinuti roman Žige Hirschlera, Cantus, 1994, 80/81, str. 25. (Croatian)
- "Torta – Popijevke hrvatskih skladatelja uz klavirsku pratnju" (priredili Kristina Beck – Kukavčić i Felix Spiller; Edicije Spiller – hrvatski skladatelji, Zagreb 2005). (Croatian)
- Vujnović-Tonković, Ankica, Pisana riječ Žige Hirschlera, Novi Omanut – Prilog židovskoj povijesti i kulturi, 1995, 12, str. 5–7. (Croatian)
