= Farkaševac =

- Municipality
- Farkaševac Municipality; Općina Farkaševac
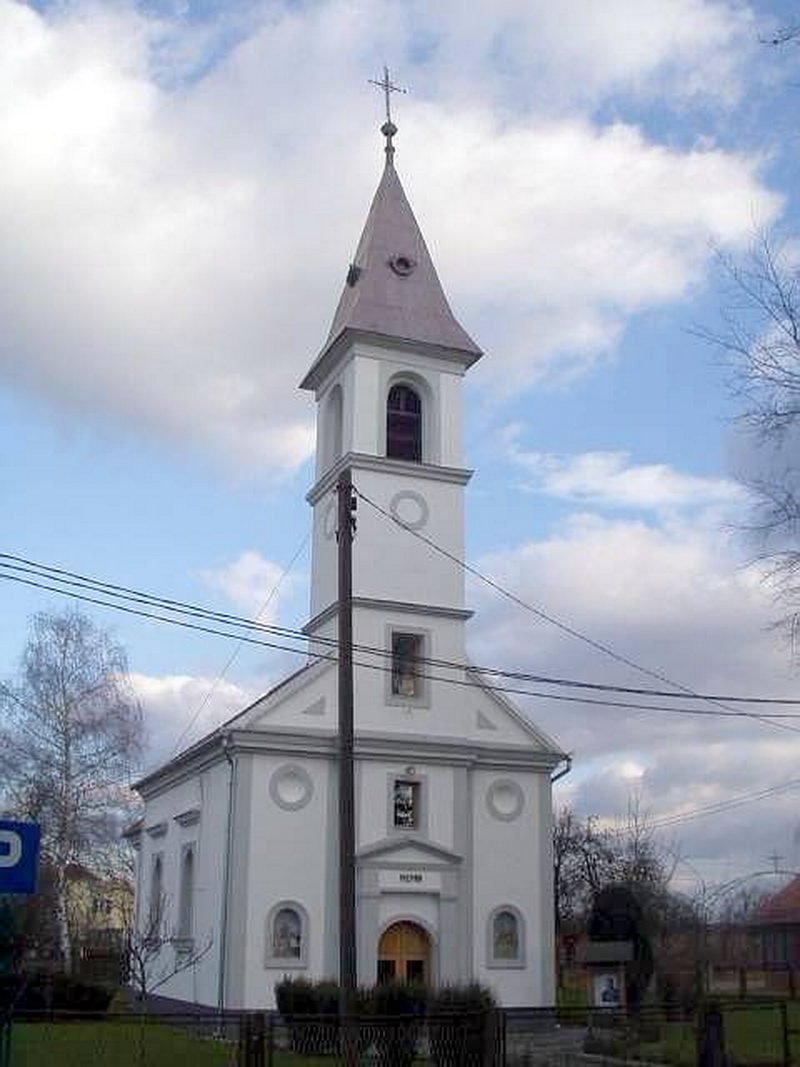
- Farkaševac, romancatholic chappel

- Flag

- Location within Croatia
- Coordinates: 45°52′50″N 16°38′09″E
- Country: Croatia
- Region: Central Croatia
- County: Zagreb County

Government
  - Mayor: Dražen Draganić (HSS)

Area
  - Municipality: 73.8 km^{2} (28.5 sq mi)
  - Urban: 7.4 km^{2} (2.9 sq mi)

Population (2021)
  - Municipality: 1,562
  - Density: 21.2/km^{2} (54.8/sq mi)
  - Urban: 287
  - Urban density: 39/km^{2} (100/sq mi)
- Time zone: UTC+1 (CET)
  - Summer (DST): UTC+2 (CEST)
- Website: opcina-farkasevac.hr

Farkaševac is a municipality in Zagreb County, Croatia.

== Symbols ==
The coat of arms of Farkaševac consists of gold coins on a tree stump, with a sapling and a maroon wolf next to it. The town's flag is green, with the coat of arms in the middle bordered in white.

== Demographics ==
=== 2011 ===
According to the 2011 census, there are 1,937 inhabitants, in the following settlements:

- Bolč, population 457
- Brezine, population 193
- Donji Markovac, population 41
- Farkaševac, population 303
- Ivančani, population 195
- Kabal, population 162
- Mački, population 84
- Majur, population 112
- Praščevac, population 120
- Zvonik, population 87
- Žabnica, population 183

92% of the population are Croats.

=== 1910 ===
According to the Austro-Hungarian 1910 census, Municipality of Farkaševac had 3,304 inhabitants, which were ethnically and religiously declared as follows:

Population by ethnicity	Total	Croats	Serbs	Czechs	Italians	Hungarians	Germans	Ruthenians
Bolč	647	303	334	0	7	0	2	1
Brezine	335	331	3	1	0	0	0	0
Donji Markovac	170	58	112	0	0	0	0	0
Farkaševac	376	359	8	8	0	1	0	0
Ivančani	393	154	225	13	0	1	0	0
Kabal	351	251	100	0	0	0	0	0
Mački	137	132	5	0	0	0	0	0
Majur	175	141	30	1	0	2	1	0
Praščevac	260	259	1	0	0	0	0	0
Zvonik	161	98	60	3	0	0	0	0
Žabnica	299	256	43	0	0	0	0	0
Total	3,304	2,342 (70.88%)	921 (27.87%)	26 (0.78%)	7 (0.21%)	4 (0.12%)	3 (0.09%)	1 (0.03%)

Population by religion	Total	Roman Catholics	Eastern Orthodox	Jews	Eastern Catholics
Bolč	647	307	335	4	1
Brezine	335	332	3	0	0
Donji Markovac	170	58	112	0	0
Farkaševac	376	363	8	5	0
Ivančani	393	168	225	0	0
Kabal	351	251	100	0	0
Mački	137	132	5	0	0
Majur	175	145	30	0	0
Praščevac	260	259	1	0	0
Zvonik	161	101	60	0	0
Žabnica	299	256	43	0	0
Total	3,304	2,372 (71.79%)	922 (27.90%)	9 (0.27%)	1 (0.03%)
