= Nova Pisanica =

- Village
- Location within Croatia
- Coordinates: 45.8060504°N 17.0999911°E
- Country: Croatia
- County: Bjelovar-Bilogora County
- Municipality: Velika Pisanica

Area
  - Total: 1.6 sq mi (4.1 km^{2})

Population (2021)
  - Total: 37
  - Density: 23/sq mi (9.0/km^{2})
- Time zone: UTC+1 (CET)
  - Summer (DST): UTC+2 (CEST)

Nova Pisanica is a village in Croatia.

== Demographics ==
According to the 2021 census, its population was 37.
