= Velika Mlinska =

- Village
- Location within Croatia
- Coordinates: 45.656987°N 16.8935511°E
- Country: Croatia
- County: Bjelovar-Bilogora County
- Municipality: Velika Trnovitica

Area
  - Total: 2.8 sq mi (7.3 km^{2})

Population (2021)
  - Total: 92
  - Density: 33/sq mi (13/km^{2})
- Time zone: UTC+1 (CET)
  - Summer (DST): UTC+2 (CEST)

Velika Mlinska is a village in Croatia.

== Demographics ==
According to the 2021 census, its population was 92.
