= Pavle Solarić =

Serbian linguist and geographer

- Born: Павле Соларић; 7 August 1779; Velika Pisanica, Bjelovar, Kingdom of Slavonia, Habsburg Empire (now part of Croatia)
- Died: 18 January 1821 (aged 41)
- Occupations: linguist geographer archaeologist poet
- Notable work: "Pominak knjižeski"

Pavle Solarić (7 August 1779 – 18 January 1821) was a Serbian linguist, geographer, archaeologist, poet, bibliographer and man of letters. He was one of Dositej Obradović's early students and an ardent disciple.

== Biography ==
Solarić was born into a Serbian Orthodox clerical family in the village of Velika Pisanica near Bjelovar, then part of the Varaždin Generalat of the Military Frontier, a province of the Habsburg Empire (now part of Croatia). Solarić completed his education at Zagreb and Sremski Karlovci, graduating in 1803 with a degree in law. He left for Italy where he dedicated himself to writing and research. He was a successful translator from French, Italian and German. He became a corrector of the Slavic printing office in Venice, a municipal government post he held until his death.

== Works ==
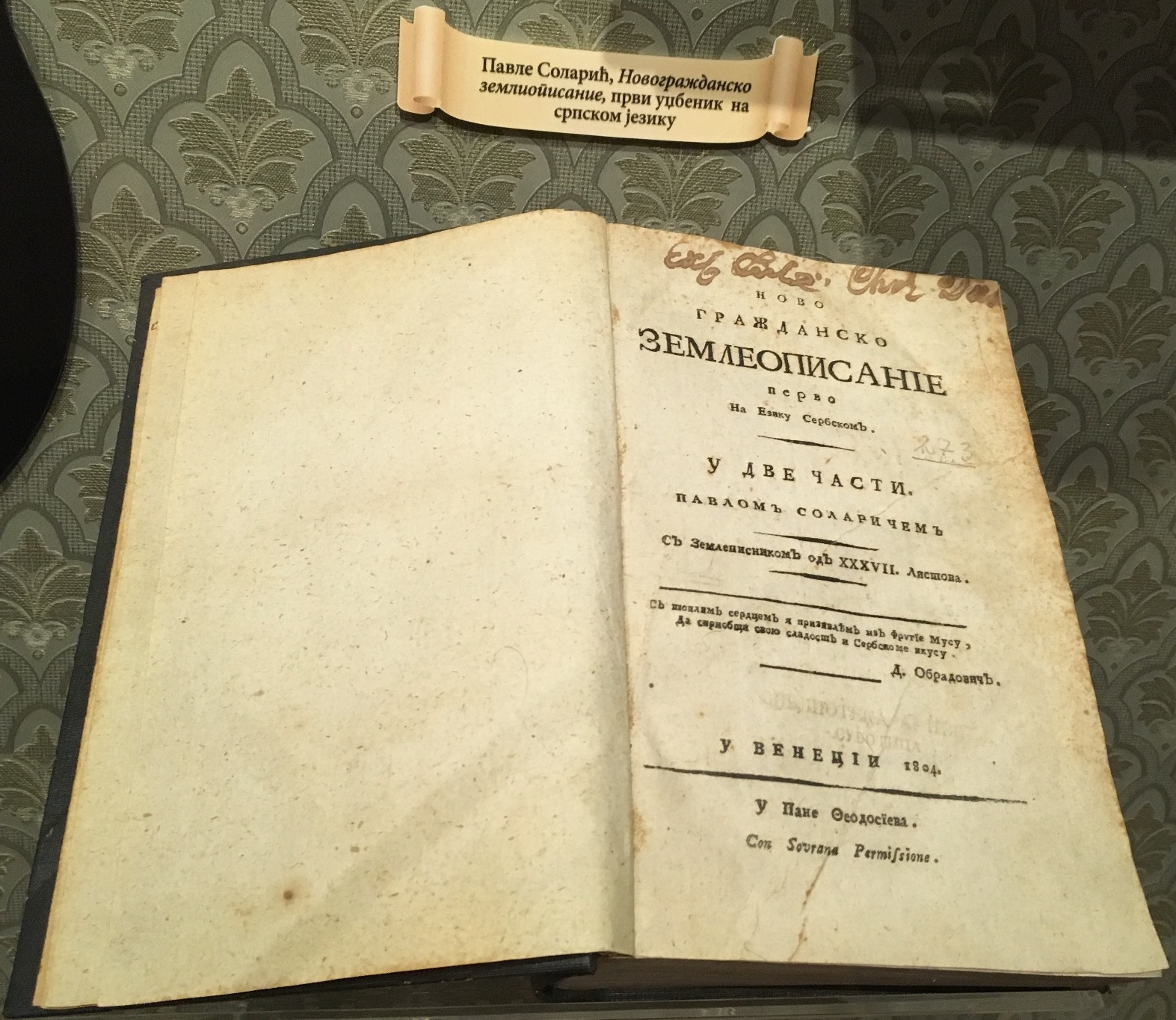
The first modern Serbian geography textbook by Pavle Solarić, printed in Venice, 1804.

In 1804 he wrote Graždansko Zemljeopisanie (Geography in Civil Letters), the first book written by a Serb in the language of the common folk. In Preface, Solarić states that his work is supplemented translation of Adam Christian Gaspari Allgemeine Geographische Ephemeriden. The book is now part of the private library of Joca Vujić.

Pavle Solarić's "Pominak knjižeski" (Literary Record, 1810) is usually regarded as the first attempt at Serbian literary history. This catalogue of Slavonic books printed in Venice is a precise description of books in the Cyrillic and Glagolitic scripts; it also includes a voluminous introduction to the Serbian literature, called "Illyrian" by the author. He published Dositej Obradović's Mezimac.

His poetry remained forgotten, owing to the critical reception at the beginning of the 20th century. Since then, however, his work is currently being appreciated, thanks to Zdravko Krstanović and Milorad Pavić who brought the poems from old archives to the attention of the reading public under the title of Gozba. Solarić translated Ulog uma čelovječeskoga (Vienna, 1810) from the German by philosopher Karl von Eckartshausen's Aufschlüsse zur Magie aus geprüften Erfahrungen über verborgene philosophische Wissenschaften und verdeckte Geheimnisse der Natur(4 vols., Munich. 1788–1792).

Solarić's philosophical, philological, historical, geographical, bibliographical and ethnological work has yet to be systematically and thoroughly examined. Just recently a Serbian historian Radovan Damjanović discovered that Pavle Solarić's "Romans of Slavonia" was written as a result of socializing with Frederick North, 5th Earl of Guilford, a former first British Governor of Ceylon, then Minister of Education of the Ionian Islands.

== Sources ==
- Jovan Skerlić (1921) [1914]. Istorija nove srpske književnosti. Belgrade. pp. 112–114.
- Gozba (Collected poems by Pavle Solarić): "[Projekat Rastko] Pavle Solaric (1779-1821): Gozba".
