= Mala Trnovitica =

- Village
- Location within Croatia
- Coordinates: 45.7109291°N 16.9213611°E
- Country: Croatia
- County: Bjelovar-Bilogora County
- Municipality: Velika Trnovitica

Area
  - Total: 1.9 sq mi (4.9 km^{2})

Population (2021)
  - Total: 48
  - Density: 25/sq mi (9.8/km^{2})
- Time zone: UTC+1 (CET)
  - Summer (DST): UTC+2 (CEST)

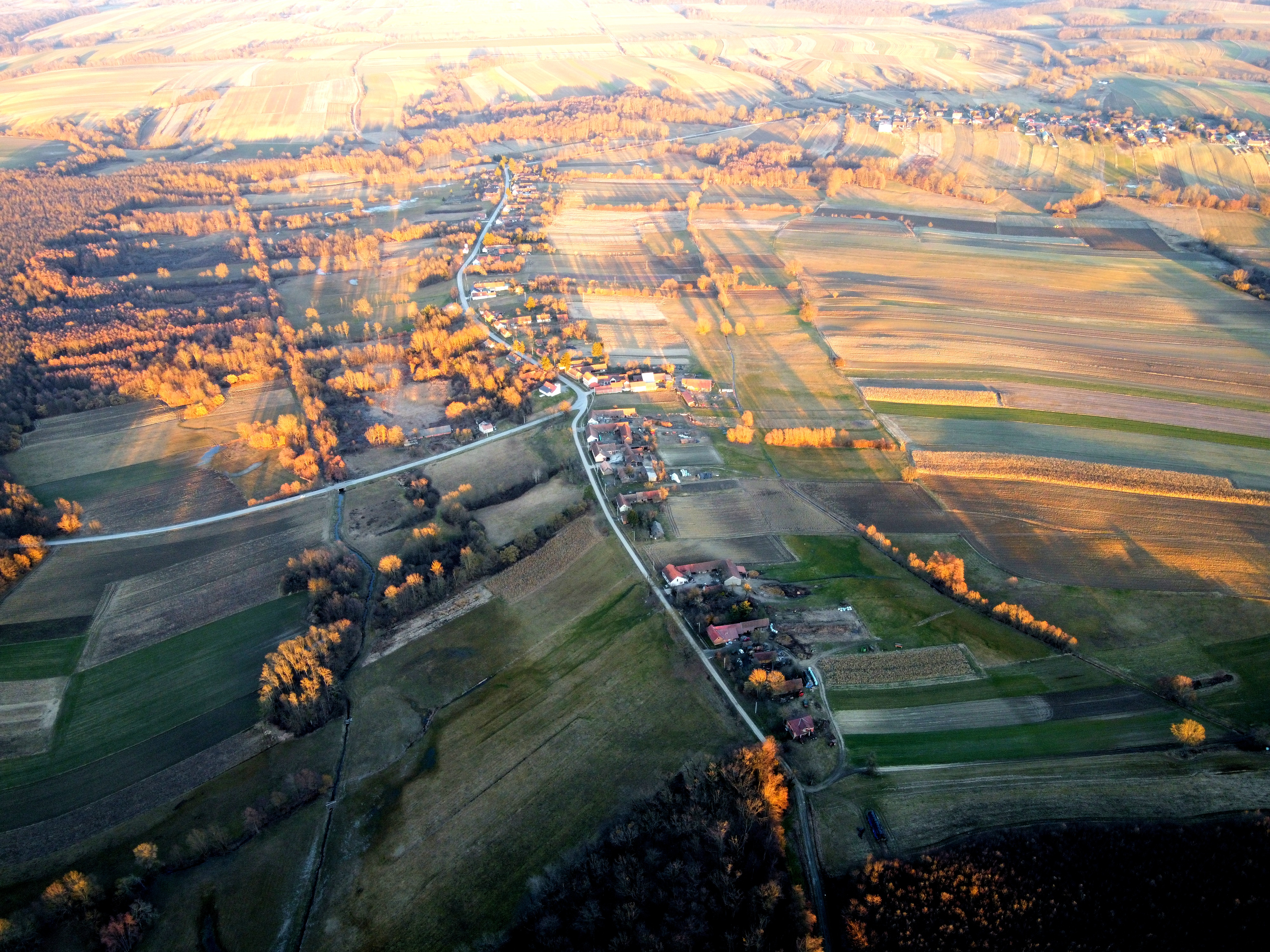
Mala Trnovitica

Mala Trnovitica is a village in Croatia.

== Demographics ==
According to the 2021 census, its population was 48.
