= Pupelica =

- Village
- Location within Croatia
- Coordinates: 45.8946779°N 17.0131348°E
- Country: Croatia
- County: Bjelovar-Bilogora County
- Municipality: Šandrovac

Area
  - Total: 5.9 sq mi (15.4 km^{2})

Population (2021)
  - Total: 118
  - Density: 19.8/sq mi (7.66/km^{2})
- Time zone: UTC+1 (CET)
  - Summer (DST): UTC+2 (CEST)

Pupelica is a village in Croatia.

== Demographics ==
According to the 2021 census, its population was 118.
