= Gornja Ploščica =

- Village
- Location within Croatia
- Coordinates: 45.7154434°N 16.8913631°E
- Country: Croatia
- County: Bjelovar-Bilogora County
- Municipality: Velika Trnovitica

Area
  - Total: 0.66 sq mi (1.7 km^{2})

Population (2021)
  - Total: 32
  - Density: 49/sq mi (19/km^{2})
- Time zone: UTC+1 (CET)
  - Summer (DST): UTC+2 (CEST)

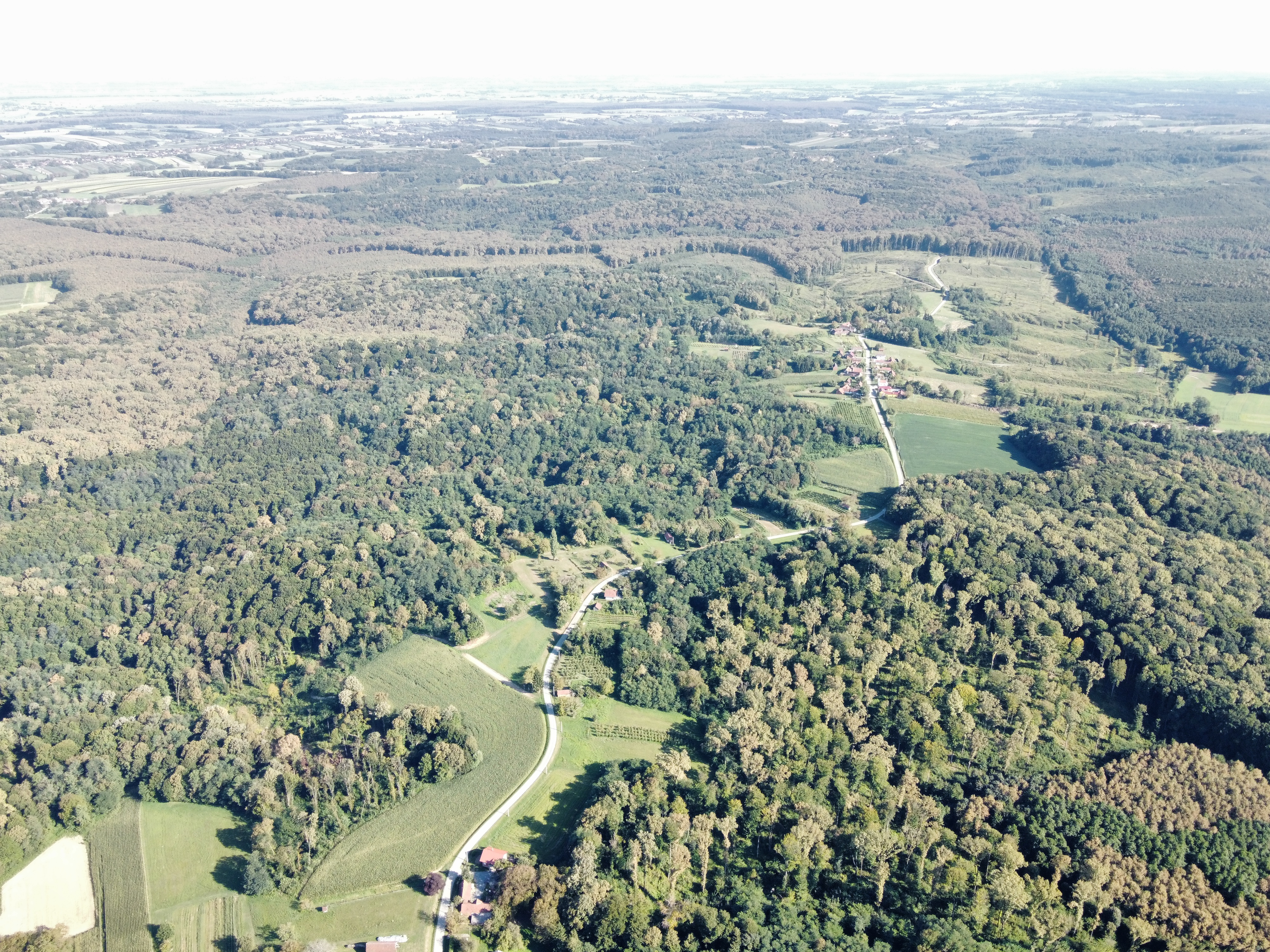
Gornja plošćica

Gornja Ploščica is a village in Croatia.

== Demographics ==
According to the 2021 census, its population was 32.
