= Česma =

River in Croatia

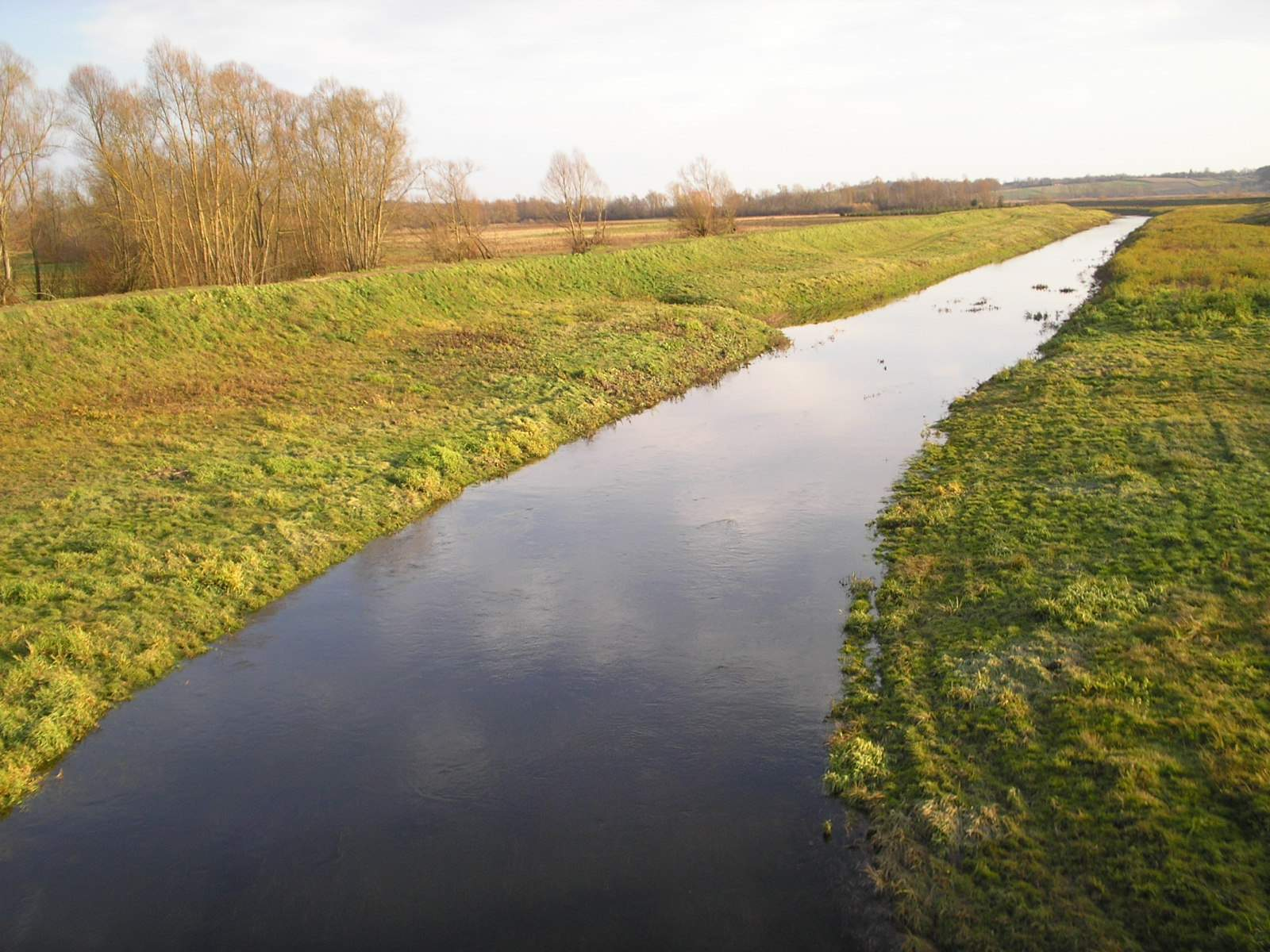
- Česma river at Narta near Bjelovar.

Location
- Country: Croatia

Physical characteristics
- Source
  - elevation: 114 m (374 ft)
- Mouth
  - location: Lonja
  - coordinates: 45°34′31″N 16°28′16″E
  - elevation: 84 m (276 ft)
- Length: 105.7 km (65.7 mi)
- Basin size: 3,253 km^{2} (1,256 sq mi)
- Discharge
  - average: 14.1 m^{3}/s (500 cu ft/s)

Basin features
- Progression: Lonja→ Sava→ Danube→ Black Sea
- Tributaries
  - right: Račačka, Bjelovacka, Velika, Glogovnica

The Česma is a river in central Croatia, a left tributary of the river Lonja-Trebež. It is 106 km (66 mi) long, and its catchment area is 3,253 km^{2} (1,256 sq mi).

It is created by merging streams Grđevica and Barna at 45°43′32″N 17°03′01″E near the village of Pavlovac in the municipality of Veliki Grđevac. The Česma basin is fan-shaped and formed by a number of streams rising on the slopes of Bilogora and Moslavačka Gora hills. Southern sides of Bilogora slightly goes downhill, rugged with numerous ravines and gullies, steeply and deeply cut in. On the sides appear numerous springs, whose flow reduces or dries up during the dry part of the year.

It has a small drop (small difference in altitude between the source and the mouth) which was causing frequent floods before the regulation of the riverbed. The area around the watercourse of Česma till a hundred years ago was subject of flooding, which is why it was swampy. After that, Česma river and its tributaries was channelized, embankments were built for flood protection, and the soil is dried to obtain arable land as well as the fight against malaria.

At the site of former wetlands now are fish ponds that supply water from streams that flows into the Česma river. These ponds are one of the last refuge of wading birds between the Drava and Sava rivers.

Along Česma river there are several major fish farming complexes. North of Česma fish pond — ribnjačastvo Dubrava, and along the southern coast fish ponds — Siščani, Blatnica and Narta. Both complexes are spread at about 5 kilometers along the course Česma river, and environment are similar. They are about 5 kilometers away to each other. The total area covered by commercial fish ponds is 1,346 ha (3,330 acres).
