= Polum =

- Village
- Location within Croatia
- Coordinates: 45.8207149°N 17.0655507°E
- Country: Croatia
- County: Bjelovar-Bilogora County
- Municipality: Velika Pisanica

Area
  - Total: 1.7 sq mi (4.4 km^{2})

Population (2021)
  - Total: 35
  - Density: 21/sq mi (8.0/km^{2})
- Time zone: UTC+1 (CET)
  - Summer (DST): UTC+2 (CEST)

Polum is a village in Croatia.

== Demographics ==
According to the 2021 census, its population was 35.
