= Ravneš =

- Village
- Location within Croatia
- Coordinates: 45.8763814°N 16.9752151°E
- Country: Croatia
- County: Bjelovar-Bilogora County
- Municipality: Šandrovac

Area
  - Total: 2.5 sq mi (6.4 km^{2})

Population (2021)
  - Total: 90
  - Density: 36/sq mi (14/km^{2})
- Time zone: UTC+1 (CET)
  - Summer (DST): UTC+2 (CEST)

Ravneš is a village in Croatia.

== Demographics ==
According to the 2021 census, its population was 90.
