= Bačkovica =

- Village
- Location within Croatia
- Coordinates: 45.8448087°N 17.078982°E
- Country: Croatia
- County: Bjelovar-Bilogora County
- Municipality: Velika Pisanica

Area
  - Total: 2.6 sq mi (6.8 km^{2})

Population (2021)
  - Total: 27
  - Density: 10/sq mi (4.0/km^{2})
- Time zone: UTC+1 (CET)
  - Summer (DST): UTC+2 (CEST)

Bačkovica is a village in Croatia.

== Demographics ==
According to the 2021 census, its population was 27.
