= Gradec, Zagreb County =

Gradec
- Municipality
- Municipality of Gradec
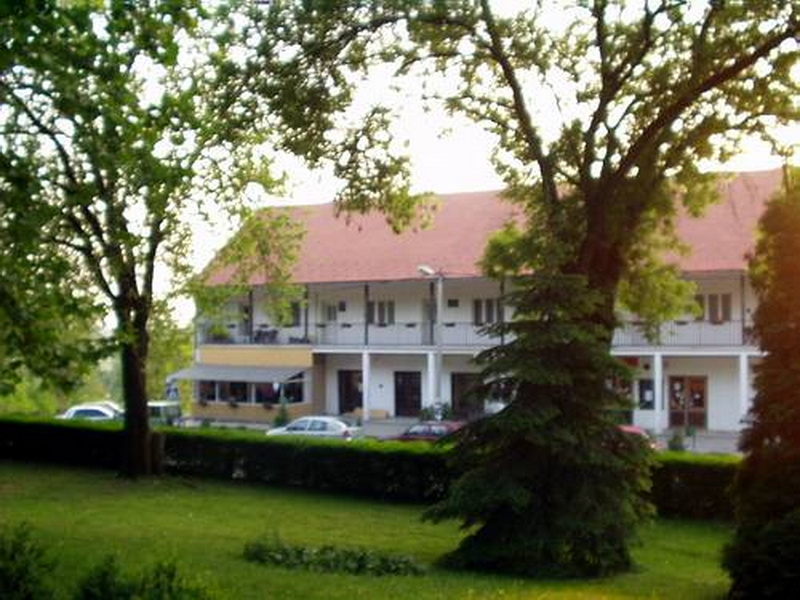
- Interactive map of Gradec
- Location of Gradec in Croatia
- Coordinates: 45°54′37″N 16°29′1″E
- Country: Croatia
- County: Zagreb County

Area
  - Municipality: 89.0 km^{2} (34.4 sq mi)
  - Urban: 6.3 km^{2} (2.4 sq mi)

Population (2021)
  - Municipality: 3,189
  - Density: 35.8/km^{2} (92.8/sq mi)
  - Urban: 403
  - Urban density: 64/km^{2} (170/sq mi)
- Time zone: UTC+1 (Central European Time)
- Vehicle registration: ZG
- Website: gradec.hr

Gradec is a village located ~50 km from Zagreb, Croatia.

The municipality has an area of 88.85 km^{2} (34.31 sq mi). In the 2011 Croatian census the municipality had 3,681 inhabitants, living in 20 settlements:

- Buzadovac, population 109
- Cugovec, population 391
- Festinec, population 65
- Fuka, population 99
- Grabrić, population 89
- Gradec, population 461
- Gradečki Pavlovec, population 473
- Haganj, population 504
- Lubena, population 124
- Mali Brezovec, population 77
- Podjales, population 202
- Pokasin, population 66
- Potočec, population 88
- Remetinec, population 67
- Repinec, population 240
- Salajci, population 72
- Stari Glog, population 104
- Tučenik, population 103
- Veliki Brezovec, population 189
- Zabrđe, population 158

== Famous people ==
- Nevenka Topalušić
