= Gornja Trnovitica =

- Village
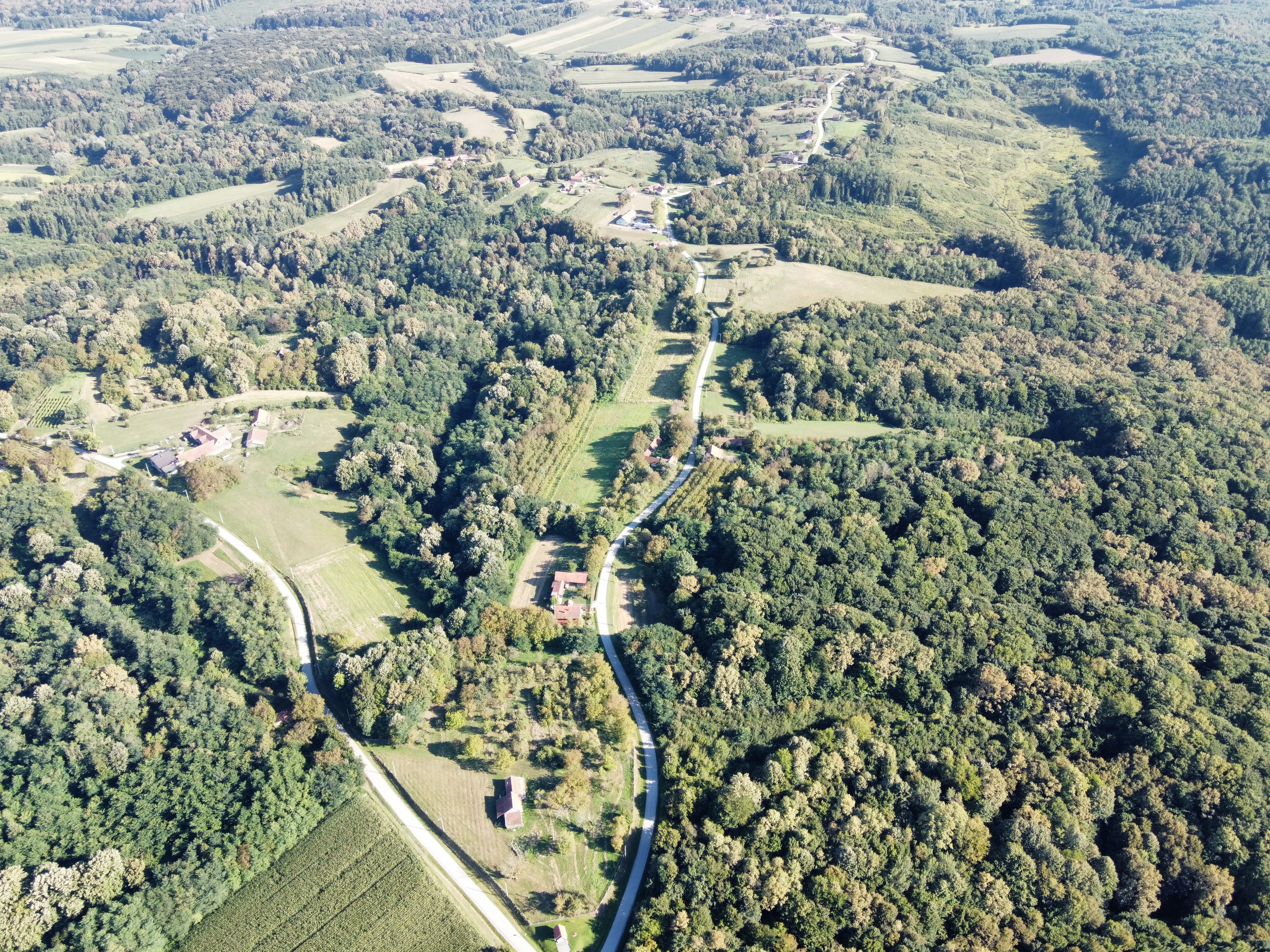

- Location within Croatia
- Coordinates: 45.6990262°N 16.8951143°E
- Country: Croatia
- County: Bjelovar-Bilogora County
- Municipality: Velika Trnovitica

Area
  - Total: 2.3 sq mi (5.9 km^{2})

Population (2021)
  - Total: 44
  - Density: 19/sq mi (7.5/km^{2})
- Time zone: UTC+1 (CET)
  - Summer (DST): UTC+2 (CEST)

Gornja Trnovitica is a village in Croatia.

== Demographics ==
According to the 2021 census, its population was 44.
