= Mlinski Vinogradi =

- Village
- Location within Croatia
- Coordinates: 45.6722662°N 16.9142274°E
- Country: Croatia
- County: Bjelovar-Bilogora County
- Municipality: Velika Trnovitica

Area
  - Total: 0.69 sq mi (1.8 km^{2})

Population (2021)
  - Total: 25
  - Density: 36/sq mi (14/km^{2})
- Time zone: UTC+1 (CET)
  - Summer (DST): UTC+2 (CEST)

Mlinski Vinogradi is a village in Croatia.

== Demographics ==
According to the 2021 census, its population was 25.
