= Mački, Croatia =

Mački
- Village
- Interactive map of Mački
- Location within Croatia
- Coordinates: 45.9076°N 16.6575°E
- Country: Croatia
- County: Zagreb County
- Municipality: Farkaševac

Area
  - Total: 2.2 km^{2} (0.85 sq mi)

Population (2021)
  - Total: 64
  - Density: 29/km^{2} (75/sq mi)
- Time zone: UTC+1 (CET)
  - Summer (DST): UTC+2 (CEST)

Mački is a village in the municipality of Farkaševac, Zagreb County, Croatia.

== Geography ==
The village is located at an altitude of 115 m above sea level, and situated 67 km from the national capital, Zagreb.

== Demographics ==
In the 2021 census, the total population of the village was 64 inhabitants.

== History ==
It was the site of a battle in 1197 between Emeric, King of Hungary and Andrew, Duke of Slavonia.
