= Nevenka Topalušić =

Croatian nurse and war veteran (1954–2014)

Nevenka Topalušić (née Vrčak; 21 November 1954 – 22 October 2014) was a Croatian nurse and war veteran.

Born in Gradec, where she attended elementary school, Topalušić was educated at the medical school in Zadar and graduated in palliative care at the School of Medicine in Zagreb. At the dawn of the Croatian War for Independence, she worked as a nurse in a health centre in Vrbovec, where she was also a member of the ambulance service. Before the outbreak of the war, she gave birth to two sons (Dubravko, Željko) and a daughter Ana.

During the war she fought in the 51st battalion from Vrbovec. Together with her husband Branko and son Dubravko, she engaged in providing accommodation and medical treatment to the wounded soldiers and civilians, as well as enemy soldiers and member of the UNPROFOR forces. Topalušić participated in Operation Storm. She was heavily wounded during the Operation Una, due to which she spent the rest of her life in a wheelchair. Although having 28 pieces of shrapnel and four bullets in her body, after the war she gave birth to her fourth child.

She was awarded the Order of the Croatian Cross, Homeland's Gratitude Medal and Operation Oluja Medal.

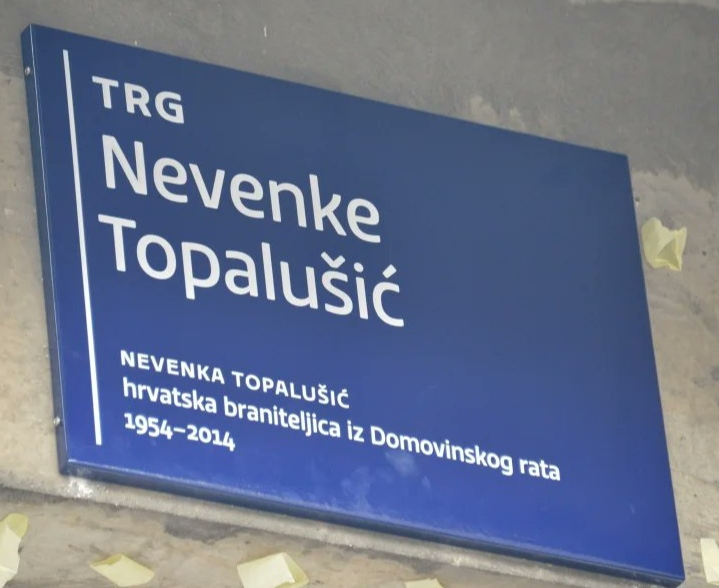
Nevenka Topalušić Square in Zagreb

She died during the 2014–2016 Croatian war veterans protest in October 2014. The square where she participated in protests (in front of the Ministry of Croatian Veterans) was named after her.
