= Nova Ploščica =

- Village
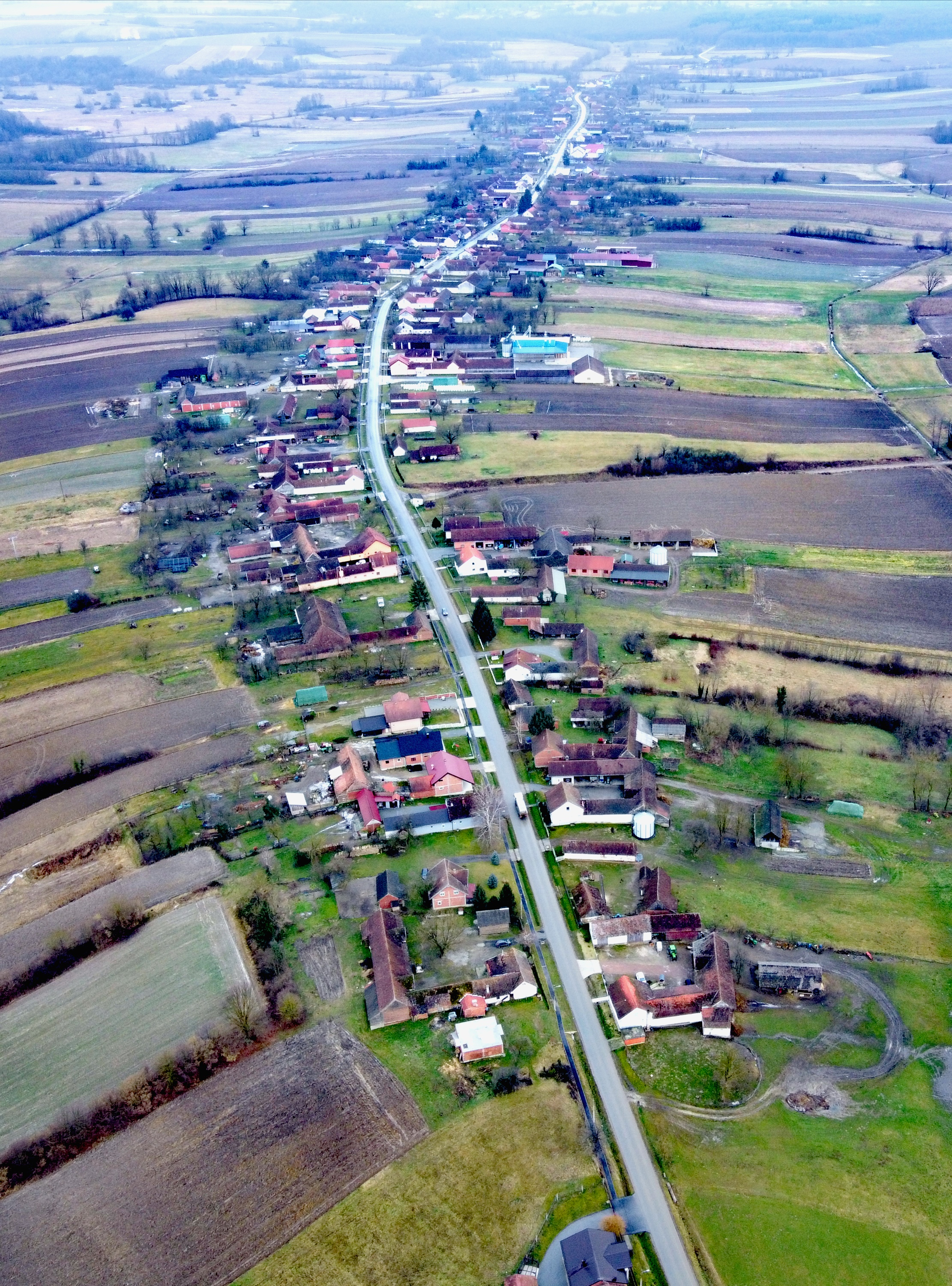
- Aerial view of Nova Ploščica

- Location within Croatia
- Coordinates: 45.7321724°N 16.9023749°E
- Country: Croatia
- County: Bjelovar-Bilogora County
- Municipality: Velika Trnovitica

Area
  - Total: 4.4 sq mi (11.5 km^{2})

Population (2021)
  - Total: 298
  - Density: 67.1/sq mi (25.9/km^{2})
- Time zone: UTC+1 (CET)
  - Summer (DST): UTC+2 (CEST)

Nova Ploščica is a village in Croatia.

== Demographics ==
According to the 2021 census, its population was 298.
