= Jasenik, Šandrovac =

Jasenik
- Village
- Location within Croatia
- Coordinates: 45.9306082°N 17.0270025°E
- Country: Croatia
- County: Bjelovar-Bilogora County
- Municipality: Šandrovac

Area
  - Total: 1.2 sq mi (3.2 km^{2})

Population (2021)
  - Total: 30
  - Density: 24/sq mi (9.4/km^{2})
- Time zone: UTC+1 (CET)
  - Summer (DST): UTC+2 (CEST)

Jasenik is a village in Croatia.

== Demographics ==
According to the 2021 census, its population was 30.
