= Kozarevac Račanski =

- Village
- Location within Croatia
- Coordinates: 45.7816151°N 16.8749314°E
- Country: Croatia
- County: Bjelovar-Bilogora County
- Municipality: Nova Rača

Area
  - Total: 2.5 sq mi (6.6 km^{2})

Population (2021)
  - Total: 103
  - Density: 40/sq mi (16/km^{2})
- Time zone: UTC+1 (CET)
  - Summer (DST): UTC+2 (CEST)

Kozarevac Račanski is a village in Croatia.

== Demographics ==
According to the 2021 census, its population was 103.
