= Babinac, Velika Pisanica =

Babinac
- Village
- Location within Croatia
- Coordinates: 45.8255874°N 17.0245112°E
- Country: Croatia
- County: Bjelovar-Bilogora County
- Municipality: Velika Pisanica

Area
  - Total: 3.7 sq mi (9.6 km^{2})

Population (2021)
  - Total: 219
  - Density: 59/sq mi (23/km^{2})
- Time zone: UTC+1 (CET)
  - Summer (DST): UTC+2 (CEST)

Babinac is a village in Croatia.

== Demographics ==
According to the 2021 census, its population was 219.
