= Sasovac =

- Village
- Location within Croatia
- Coordinates: 45.7627539°N 16.9104728°E
- Country: Croatia
- County: Bjelovar-Bilogora County
- Municipality: Nova Rača

Area
  - Total: 2.9 sq mi (7.5 km^{2})

Population (2021)
  - Total: 172
  - Density: 59/sq mi (23/km^{2})
- Time zone: UTC+1 (CET)
  - Summer (DST): UTC+2 (CEST)

Sasovac is a village in Croatia.

== Demographics ==
According to the 2021 census, its population was 172.
