= Dautan =

- Village
- Location within Croatia
- Coordinates: 45.8262859°N 16.9059941°E
- Country: Croatia
- County: Bjelovar-Bilogora County
- Municipality: Nova Rača

Area
  - Total: 2.7 sq mi (7.1 km^{2})

Population (2021)
  - Total: 245
  - Density: 89/sq mi (35/km^{2})
- Time zone: UTC+1 (CET)
  - Summer (DST): UTC+2 (CEST)

Dautan is a village in Croatia.

== Demographics ==
According to the 2021 census, its population was 245.
