= Prespa, Croatia =

Prespa
- Village
- Location within Croatia
- Coordinates: 45°51′49″N 16°55′06″E
- Country: Croatia
- County: Bjelovar-Bilogora County
- Elevation: 128 m (420 ft)

Population (2001)
  - Total: 546
- Time zone: UTC+1 (CET)
  - Summer (DST): UTC+2 (CEST)
- Postal code: 43000 Bjelovar
- Area code: 043
- Vehicle registration: BJ

Prespa, Croatia is a village in Croatia. It is connected by the D28 highway.
