= Bulinac =

- Village
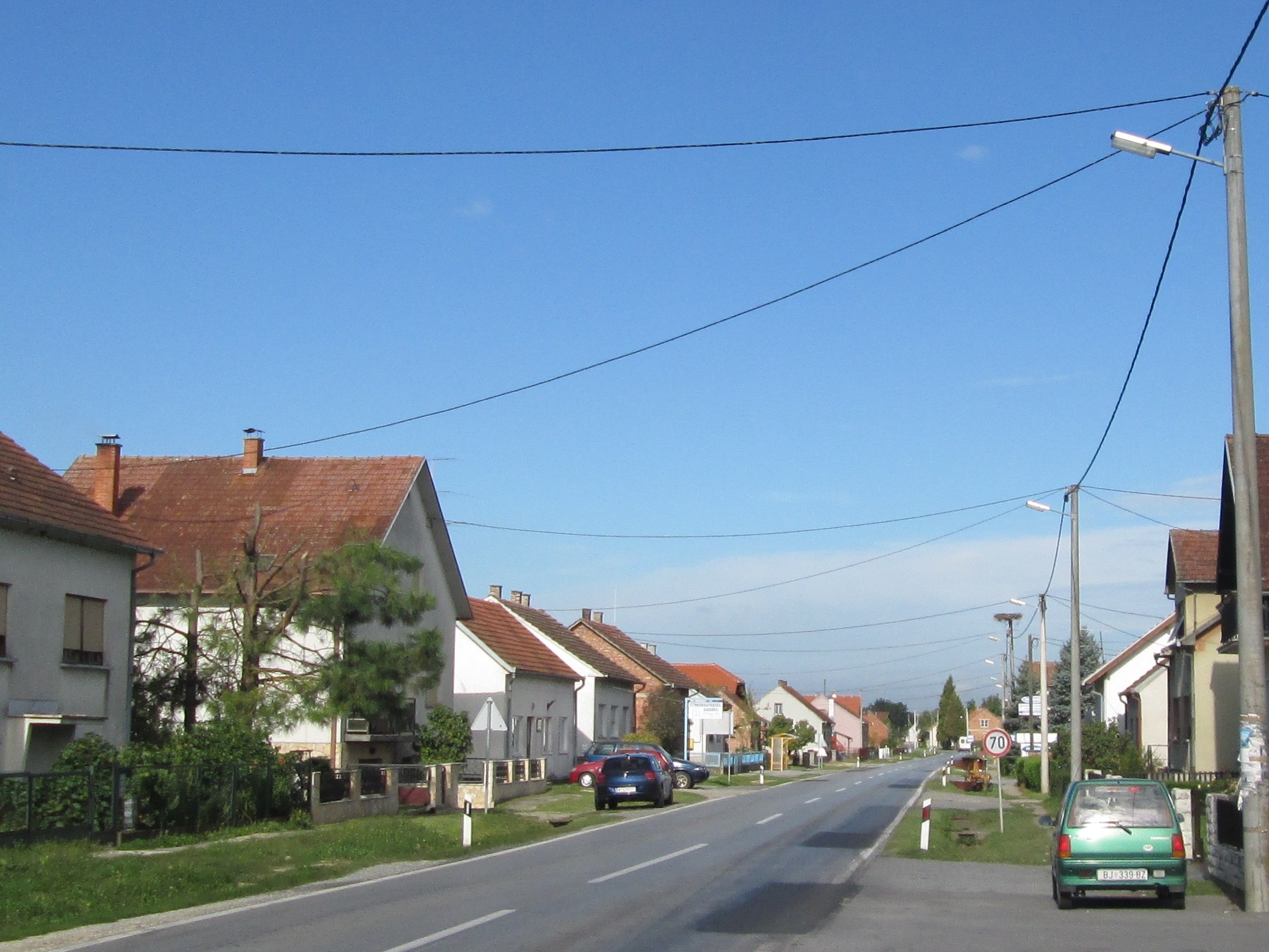
- Street of Bulinac

- Location within Croatia
- Country: Croatia
- County: Bjelovar-Bilogora County
- Municipality: Nova Rača

Area
  - Total: 1.6 sq mi (4.1 km^{2})

Population (2021)
  - Total: 314
  - Density: 200/sq mi (77/km^{2})
- Time zone: UTC+1 (CET)
  - Summer (DST): UTC+2 (CEST)

Bulinac is a village in Croatia. It is connected by the D28 highway.

== Demographics ==
According to the 2021 census, its population was 314.

== Notable natives ==
- Lavoslav Singer, Croatian industrialist
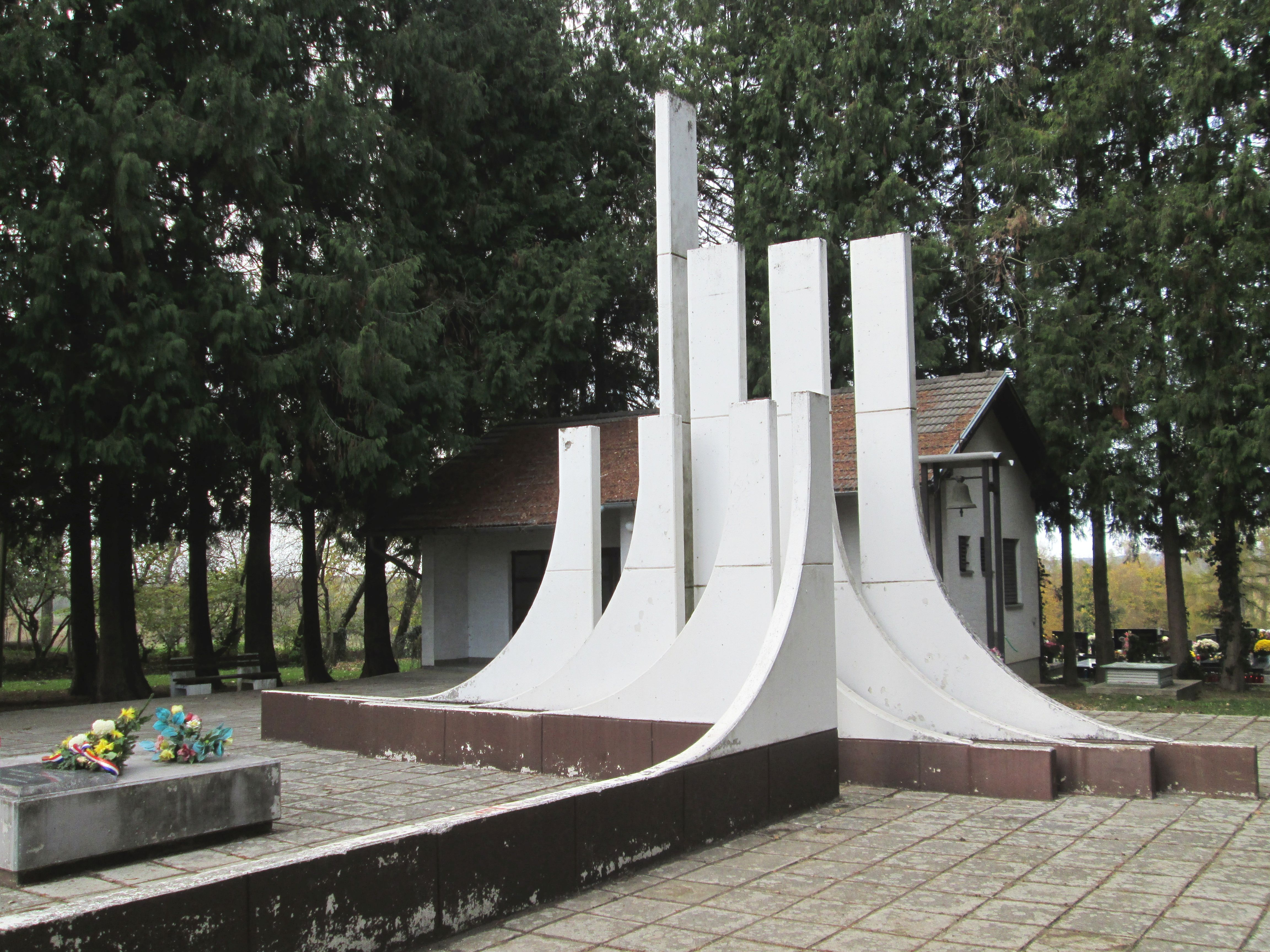
World War II memorial

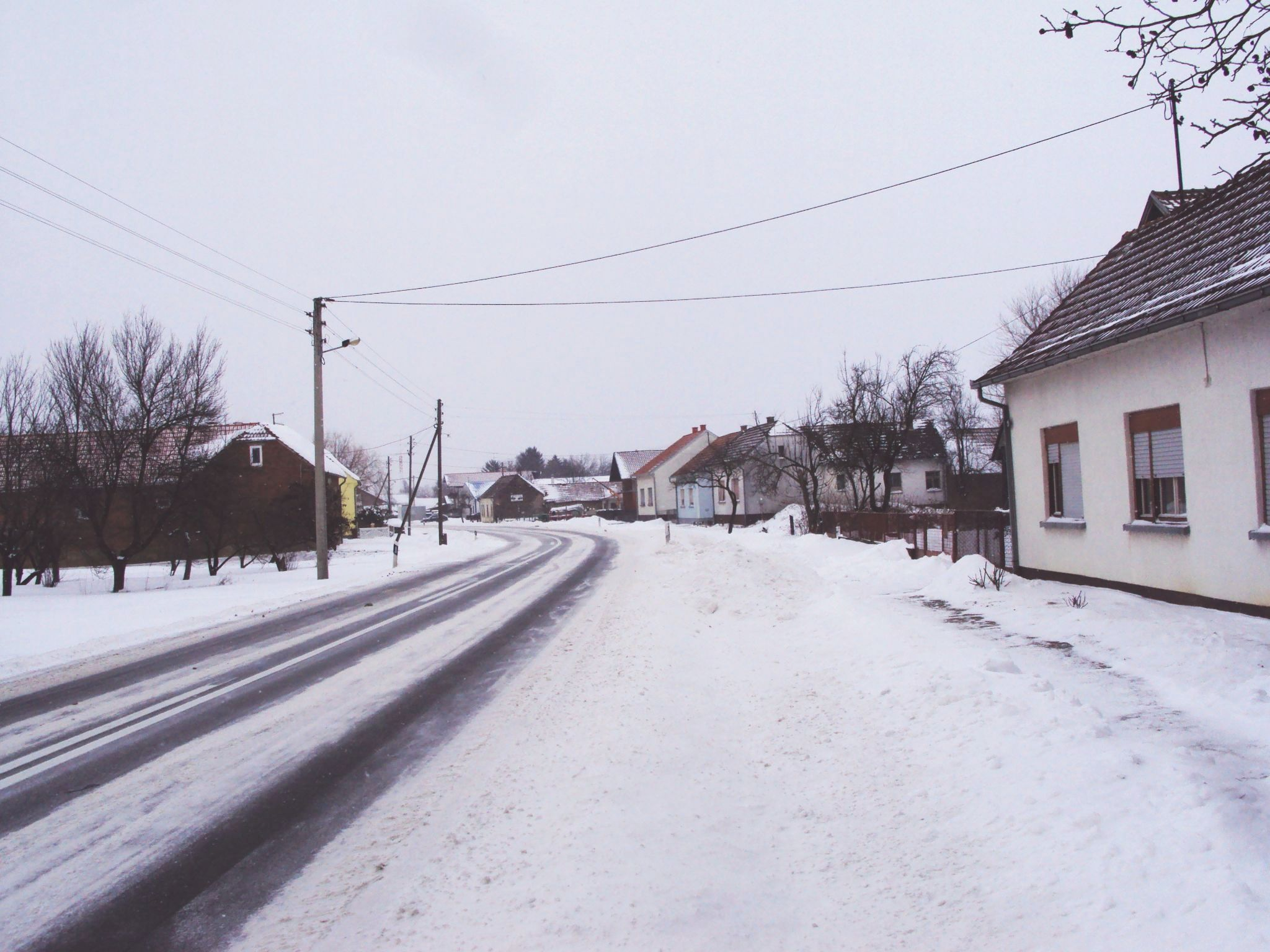
Winter in the village

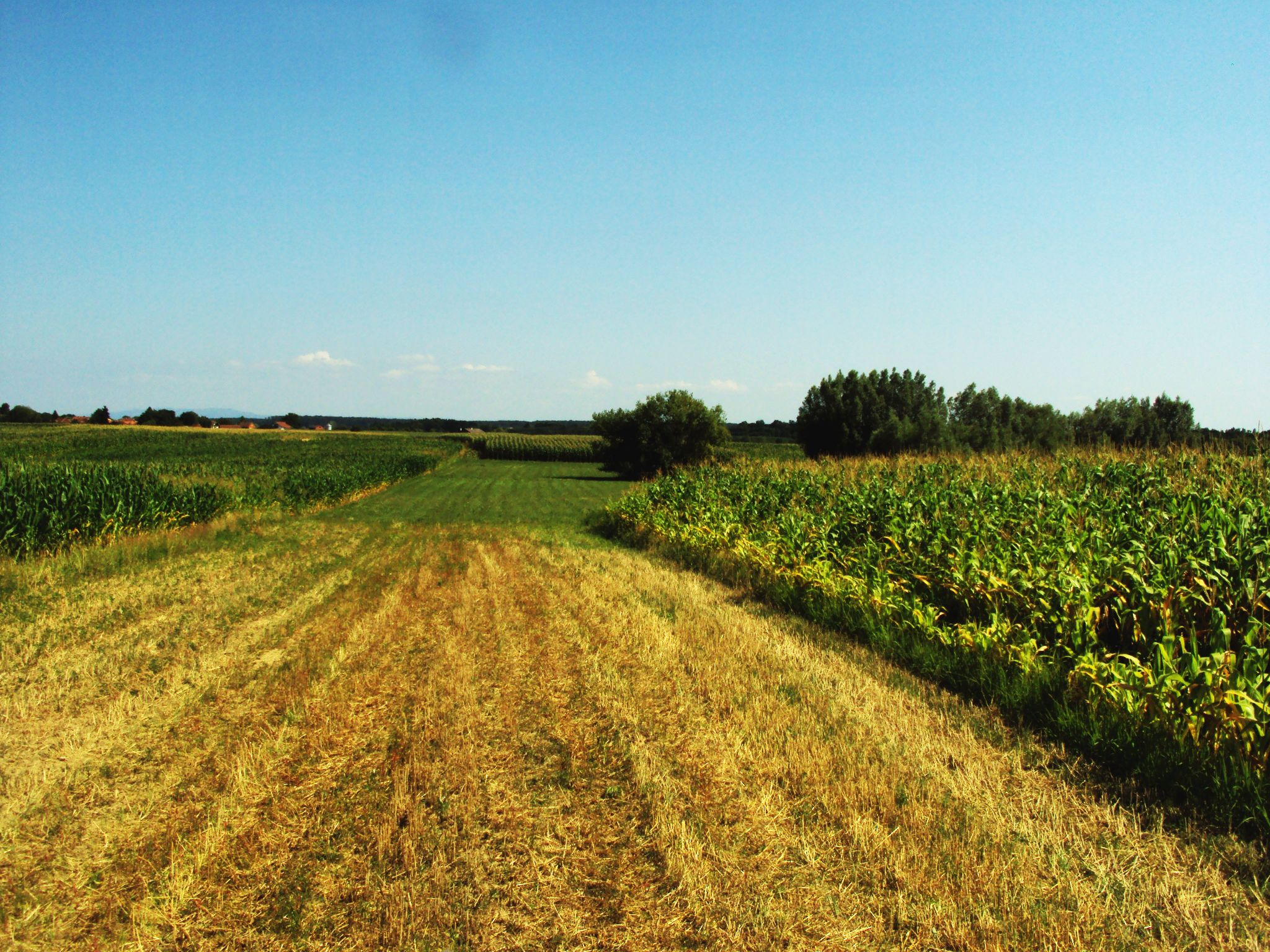
Agricultural fields
