= Velika Trnovitica =

- Municipality
- Interactive map of Velika Trnovitica
- Location within Croatia
- Coordinates: 45°41′N 16°57′E
- Country: Croatia
- County: Bjelovar-Bilogora County

Government
  - Mayor: Ivan Marković (HDZ)

Area
  - Municipality: 23.4 sq mi (60.6 km^{2})
  - Urban: 8.5 sq mi (22.1 km^{2})

Population (2021)
  - Municipality: 1,091
  - Density: 46.6/sq mi (18.0/km^{2})
  - Urban: 486
  - Urban density: 57.0/sq mi (22.0/km^{2})
- Time zone: UTC+1 (CET)
  - Summer (DST): UTC+2 (CEST)
- Postal code: 43280 Garešnica
- Area code: +385 43
- Website: velika-trnovitica.hr

Velika Trnovitica (German: Wellicha) is a settlement and a municipality in Bjelovar-Bilogora County, Croatia.

== Demographics ==
According to the 2021 census, the population of the municipality was 1,091 with 486 living in the town proper. In 2011, there were 1,370 inhabitants in the municipality, 94.8% of whom were Croats.

The municipality consists of the following settlements:

- Gornja Ploščica, population 32
- Gornja Trnovitica, population 44
- Mala Mlinska, population 66
- Mala Trnovitica, population 48
- Mlinski Vinogradi, population 25
- Nova Ploščica, population 298
- Velika Mlinska, population 92
- Velika Trnovitica, population 486
Velika Trnovitica: Population trends 1857–2021
v

population	2402	2298	2359	3247	3721	3772	3691	3856	3616	3475	3147	2591	2056	1836	1661	1370	1091
	1857	1869	1880	1890	1900	1910	1921	1931	1948	1953	1961	1971	1981	1991	2001	2011	2021

Sources: Croatian Bureau of Statistics publications

== Politics ==
=== Minority councils and representatives ===
Directly elected minority councils and representatives are tasked with consulting tasks for the local or regional authorities in which they are advocating for minority rights and interests, integration into public life and participation in the management of local affairs. At the 2023 Croatian national minorities councils and representatives elections Serbs of Croatia fulfilled legal requirements to elect 10 members minority council of the Municipality of Trnovitica but the elections were not organized due to the lack of candidates.

== Notable people ==
- Žiga Hirschler - composer, music critic and publicist
