= Međurača =

- Village
- Location within Croatia
- Coordinates: 45.7949551°N 16.8460385°E
- Country: Croatia
- County: Bjelovar-Bilogora County
- Municipality: Nova Rača

Area
  - Total: 4.9 sq mi (12.8 km^{2})

Population (2021)
  - Total: 275
  - Density: 55.6/sq mi (21.5/km^{2})
- Time zone: UTC+1 (CET)
  - Summer (DST): UTC+2 (CEST)

Međurača is a village in Croatia.

== Demographics ==
According to the 2021 census, its population was 275.
