= Jasenik, Konjic =

Jasenik Јасеник
- Village
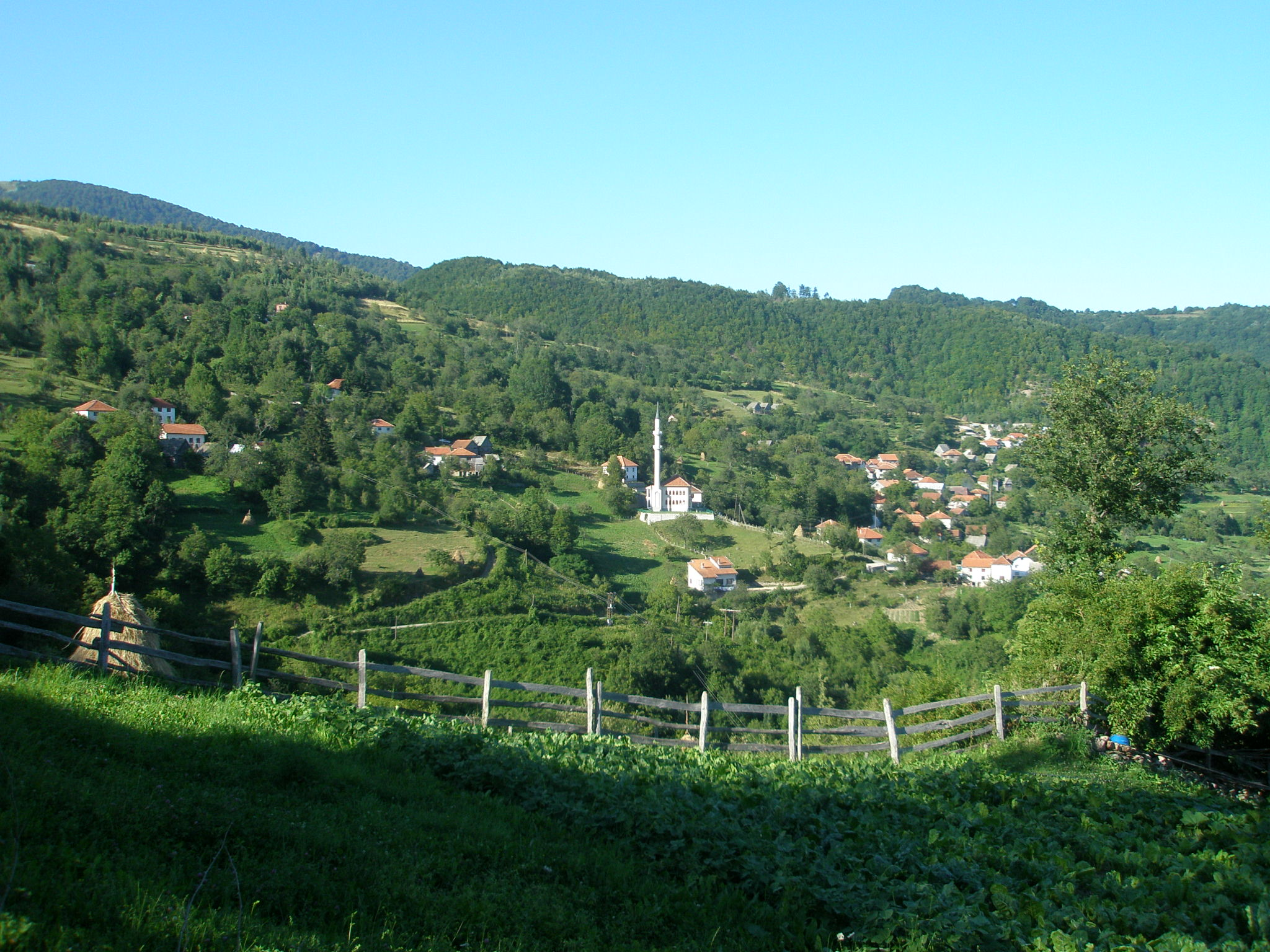

- Location within Bosnia and Herzegovina
- Country: Bosnia and Herzegovina
- Entity: Federation of Bosnia and Herzegovina
- Canton: Herzegovina-Neretva
- Municipality: Konjic

Area
  - Total: 5.06 sq mi (13.11 km^{2})

Population (2013)
  - Total: 187
  - Density: 36.9/sq mi (14.3/km^{2})
- Time zone: UTC+1 (CET)
  - Summer (DST): UTC+2 (CEST)

Jasenik (Cyrillic: Јасеник) is a village in the municipality of Konjic, Bosnia and Herzegovina.

== Demographics ==
According to the 2013 census, its population was 187.

Ethnicity in 2013
Ethnicity	Number	Percentage
Bosniaks	179	95.7%
Croats	8	4.3%
Total	187	100%
