= Brezovljani =

Coordinates: 45°56′48″N 16°34′48″E

- Village
- Interactive map of Brezovljani
- Country: Croatia
- County: Koprivnica-Križevci County
- Municipality: Sveti Ivan Žabno

Area
  - Total: 9.1 km^{2} (3.5 sq mi)

Population (2021)
  - Total: 274
  - Density: 30/km^{2} (78/sq mi)
- Time zone: UTC+1 (CET)
  - Summer (DST): UTC+2 (CEST)

Brezovljani is a village in Croatia.
