= Šandrovac =

- Municipality
- Interactive map of Šandrovac
- Location within Croatia
- Country: Croatia
- County: Bjelovar-Bilogora County

Government
  - Mayor: Dario Halauš (HDZ)

Area
  - Municipality: 24.2 sq mi (62.7 km^{2})
  - Urban: 6.6 sq mi (17.2 km^{2})

Population (2021)
  - Municipality: 1,411
  - Density: 58.3/sq mi (22.5/km^{2})
  - Urban: 623
  - Urban density: 93.8/sq mi (36.2/km^{2})
- Time zone: UTC+1 (CET)
  - Summer (DST): UTC+2 (CEST)
- Postal code: 43000 Bjelovar
- Website: sandrovac.hr

Šandrovac (German: Schandrowatz) is a settlement and municipality in Bjelovar-Bilogora County, Croatia.

In 2008, the municipality unveiled a monument to the Croatian victims of World War II.

== Demographics ==
According to the 2021 census, the population of the municipality was 1,411 with 623 living in the town proper. In 2011, there were 2,095 inhabitants, of which 84% are Croats.

The municipality consists of the following settlements:

- Jasenik, population 30
- Kašljavac, population 103
- Lasovac, population 441
- Lasovac Brdo, population 6
- Pupelica, population 118
- Ravneš, population 90
- Šandrovac, population 623
Šandrovac: Population trends 1857–2021
v

population	1709	1961	2097	2864	3603	3710	3894	4212	3956	3863	3628	3137	2733	2341	2095	1776	1411
	1857	1869	1880	1890	1900	1910	1921	1931	1948	1953	1961	1971	1981	1991	2001	2011	2021

Sources: Croatian Bureau of Statistics publications

== Politics ==
=== Minority councils and representatives ===
Directly elected minority councils and representatives are tasked with consulting tasks for the local or regional authorities in which they are advocating for minority rights and interests, integration into public life and participation in the management of local affairs. At the 2023 Croatian national minorities councils and representatives elections Serbs of Croatia fulfilled legal requirements to elect 10 members minority council of the Municipality of Šandrovac.
