= Bedenik =

- Village
- Location within Croatia
- Coordinates: 45°49′40″N 17°0′30″E
- Country: Croatia
- County: Bjelovar-Bilogora County
- Municipality: Nova Rača

Area
  - Total: 5.5 sq mi (14.2 km^{2})
- Elevation: 466 ft (142 m)

Population (2021)
  - Total: 359
  - Density: 65.5/sq mi (25.3/km^{2})
- Time zone: UTC+1 (CET)
  - Summer (DST): UTC+2 (CEST)
- Postal code: 43273
- Area code: (+385) 43

Bedenik is a village in Bjelovar-Bilogora County, Croatia. Administratively it belongs to Nova Rača.

== Location ==
It lies 15 km from the centre of Bjelovar, which may be reached on road with 18 km driving. It lies 5 km from the centre of the settlement, on the left bank of Bedenička.

== History ==
Its territory has been inhabited since the 17th century, when the territory up to that time under Osman rule has been populated by Christians. On the Josephinian Land Survey dated from 1774 it is shown as „Dorf Bedenik”. During the military administration, it belonged to the regiment of Szentgyörgyvár.

In his repertorium published in 18008 in Buda János Lipszky mentions the village as „Bedenik”. In Lajos Nagy”s work published in 1829 it is shown as „Bedenik”, where 148 houses, 418 Catholics and 364 Orthodox are registered.

After the end of military administration, the village became part of Belovár Processus, Bjelovar-Križevci County, Kingdom of Croatia-Slavonia. During the period of the Monarchy big amount of Hungarian settled in the village. In 1918 it became part of the newly established Slovene-Croatian-Serbian state, and later on Yugoslavia. Between 1941 and 1945 it was part of the Independent State of Croatia. Since 1991 it is part of the independent Croatia. Most of its population gains income from agriculture.

== Demographics ==
According to the 2021 census, its population was 359.

Change of population
1857	1869	1880	1890	1900	1910	1921	1931	1948	1953	1961	1971	1981	1991	2001	2011	2021
862	1.037	1.023	726	844	1.467	1.344	776	845	816	763	698	686	723	584	461	359

(From 1857 to 1880, as well as from 1910 to 1921 data include the population of neighbouring Babinac as well.)

== Buildings ==
Church in the centre of the village is from the 18th century. It has one part, its sanctuary faces East. Above its Western frontage, there is the belfry, which is covered by a pyramid like roof.

== Sources ==
- Official webpage of the village
- Josephinian Land Survey

== Further information ==
- Touristic office of the County
