= Škrinjari =

Coordinates: 45°56′00″N 16°35′20″E

- Village
- Interactive map of Škrinjari
- Country: Croatia

Area
  - Total: 0.66 sq mi (1.7 km^{2})

Population (2021)
  - Total: 182
  - Density: 280/sq mi (110/km^{2})
- Time zone: UTC+1 (CET)
  - Summer (DST): UTC+2 (CEST)

Škrinjari is a village in Croatia. It is connected by the D28 highway.
