= Kuštani =

Coordinates: 45°57′00″N 16°39′45″E

- Village
- Interactive map of Kuštani
- Country: Croatia
- County: Koprivnica-Križevci County

Area
  - Total: 0.8 km^{2} (0.31 sq mi)

Population (2021)
  - Total: 78
  - Density: 98/km^{2} (250/sq mi)
- Time zone: UTC+1 (CET)
  - Summer (DST): UTC+2 (CEST)

Kuštani is a village in Croatia. It is connected by the D28 highway.
