= Drljanovac =

- Village
- Location within Croatia
- Country: Croatia
- County: Bjelovar-Bilogora County
- Municipality: Nova Rača

Area
  - Total: 2.2 sq mi (5.8 km^{2})

Population (2021)
  - Total: 193
  - Density: 86/sq mi (33/km^{2})
- Time zone: UTC+1 (CET)
  - Summer (DST): UTC+2 (CEST)

Drljanovac is a village in Croatia. It is connected by the D28 highway.

== Demographics ==
According to the 2021 census, its population was 193.
