= Markovac Križevački =

Coordinates: 45°57′N 16°42′E

- Village
- Interactive map of Markovac Križevački
- Country: Croatia
- County: Koprivnica-Križevci County

Area
  - Total: 1.5 km^{2} (0.58 sq mi)

Population (2021)
  - Total: 127
  - Density: 85/km^{2} (220/sq mi)
- Time zone: UTC+1 (CET)
  - Summer (DST): UTC+2 (CEST)

Markovac Križevački is a village in Croatia. It is connected by the D28 highway.
