= Drnek (Kladno District) =

- Municipality
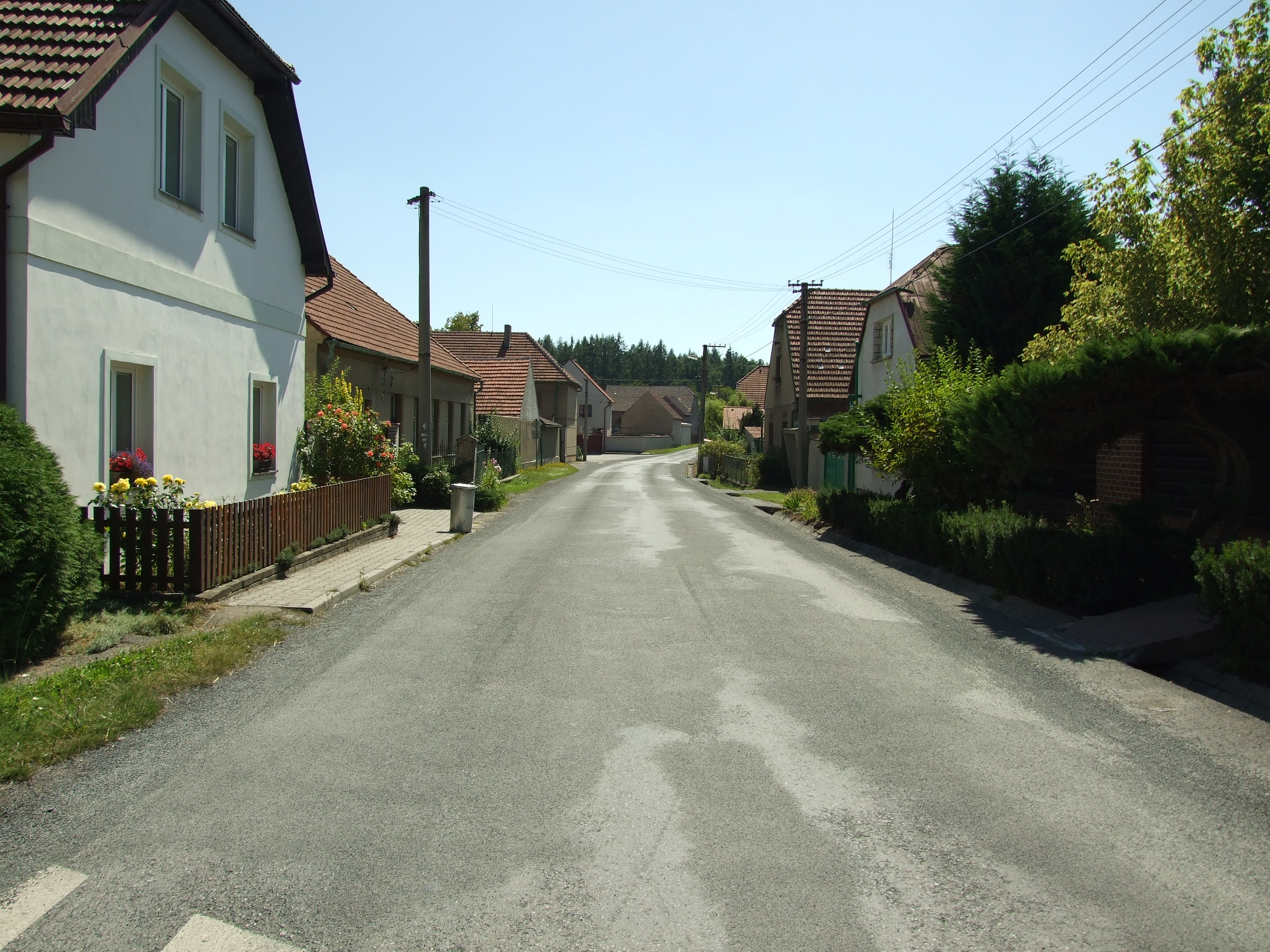
- A road in Drnek

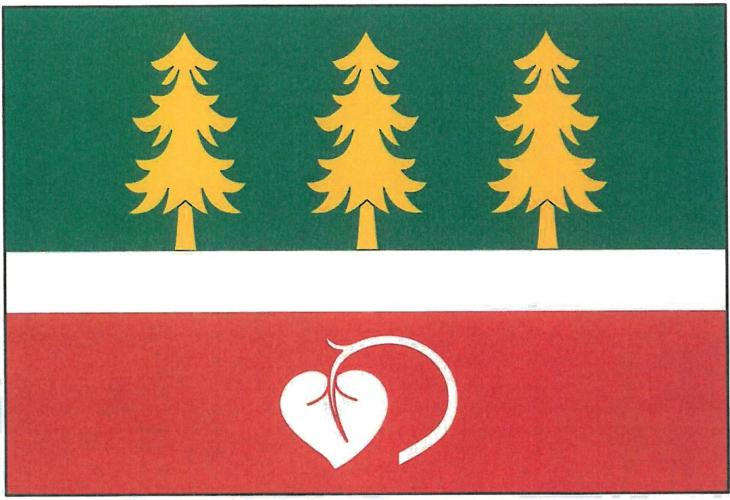
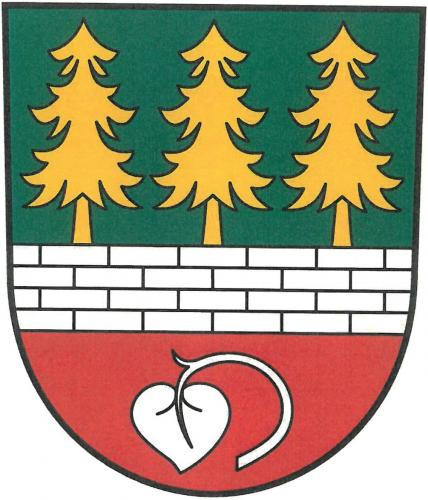
- Flag Coat of arms

- Location in the Czech Republic
- Coordinates: 50°11′45″N 13°58′21″E
- Country: Czech Republic
- Region: Central Bohemian
- District: Kladno
- Founded: 1726

Area
  - Total: 5.20 km^{2} (2.01 sq mi)
- Elevation: 412 m (1,352 ft)

Population (2026-01-01)
  - Total: 185
  - Density: 35.6/km^{2} (92.1/sq mi)
- Time zone: UTC+1 (CET)
  - Summer (DST): UTC+2 (CEST)
- Postal code: 273 77
- Website: www.obec-drnek.cz

Drnek is a municipality and village in Kladno District in the Central Bohemian Region of the Czech Republic. It has about 200 inhabitants.

== History ==
The settlement of Drnek was founded by Count Adolf Bernard Martinic in 1726, near a hunting lodge from 1711.

== Demographics ==
Historical population
Year	Pop.	±%
1869	290	—
1880	276	−4.8%
1890	263	−4.7%
1900	280	+6.5%
1910	292	+4.3%
1921	296	+1.4%
1930	312	+5.4%
1950	247	−20.8%
1961	257	+4.0%
1970	233	−9.3%
1980	216	−7.3%
1991	165	−23.6%
2001	161	−2.4%
2011	176	+9.3%
2021	190	+8.0%
Source: Censuses
