= Velika Pisanica =

- Municipality
- Interactive map of Velika Pisanica
- Location within Croatia
- Country: Croatia
- County: Bjelovar-Bilogora County

Government
  - Mayor: Fredi Pali (Independent)

Area
  - Total: 11.5 sq mi (29.7 km^{2})

Population (2021)
  - Total: 830
  - Density: 72/sq mi (28/km^{2})
- Time zone: UTC+1 (CET)
  - Summer (DST): UTC+2 (CEST)

Velika Pisanica (Hungarian: Nagypisznice, German: Groß-Pisanitz) is a settlement and municipality in Bjelovar-Bilogora County, Croatia.

== Demographics ==
According to the 2021 census, the population of the municipality was 1,313 with 830 living in the town proper. In 2011, there were 1,781 inhabitants in the municipality, of whom 72% were Croats, and 13% were Serbs (2011 census).

The municipality consists of the following settlements:

- Babinac, population 219
- Bačkovica, population 27
- Bedenička, population 13
- Čađavac, population 41
- Nova Pisanica, population 37
- Polum, population 35
- Ribnjačka, population 111
- Velika Pisanica, population 830
Velika Pisanica: Population trends 1857–2021
v

| population | 2168 | 2569 | 2328 | 4056 | 4587 | 4511 | 4424 | 5470 | 4437 | 4627 | 4355 | 3654 | 3159 | 2763 | 2151 | 1781 | 1313 |
| | 1857 | 1869 | 1880 | 1890 | 1900 | 1910 | 1921 | 1931 | 1948 | 1953 | 1961 | 1971 | 1981 | 1991 | 2001 | 2011 | 2021 |

Sources: Croatian Bureau of Statistics publications

== Politics ==
=== Minority councils and representatives ===
The Directly elected minority councils and representatives are tasked with consulting tasks for the local or regional authorities in which they are advocating for minority rights and interests, integration into public life and participation in the management of local affairs. At the 2023 Croatian national minorities councils and representatives elections Albanians and Serbs of Croatia each fulfilled legal requirements to elect their 10 members minority councils of the Municipality of Velika Pisanica.

== Notable individuals ==
- Pavle Solarić
