= Tociljevac =

- Village
- Location within Croatia
- Coordinates: 45.7789837°N 16.9240208°E
- Country: Croatia
- County: Bjelovar-Bilogora County
- Municipality: Nova Rača

Area
  - Total: 1.1 sq mi (2.8 km^{2})

Population (2021)
  - Total: 81
  - Density: 75/sq mi (29/km^{2})
- Time zone: UTC+1 (CET)
  - Summer (DST): UTC+2 (CEST)

Tociljevac is a village in Croatia.

== Demographics ==
According to the 2021 census, its population was 81.
