= Haganj =

- Village
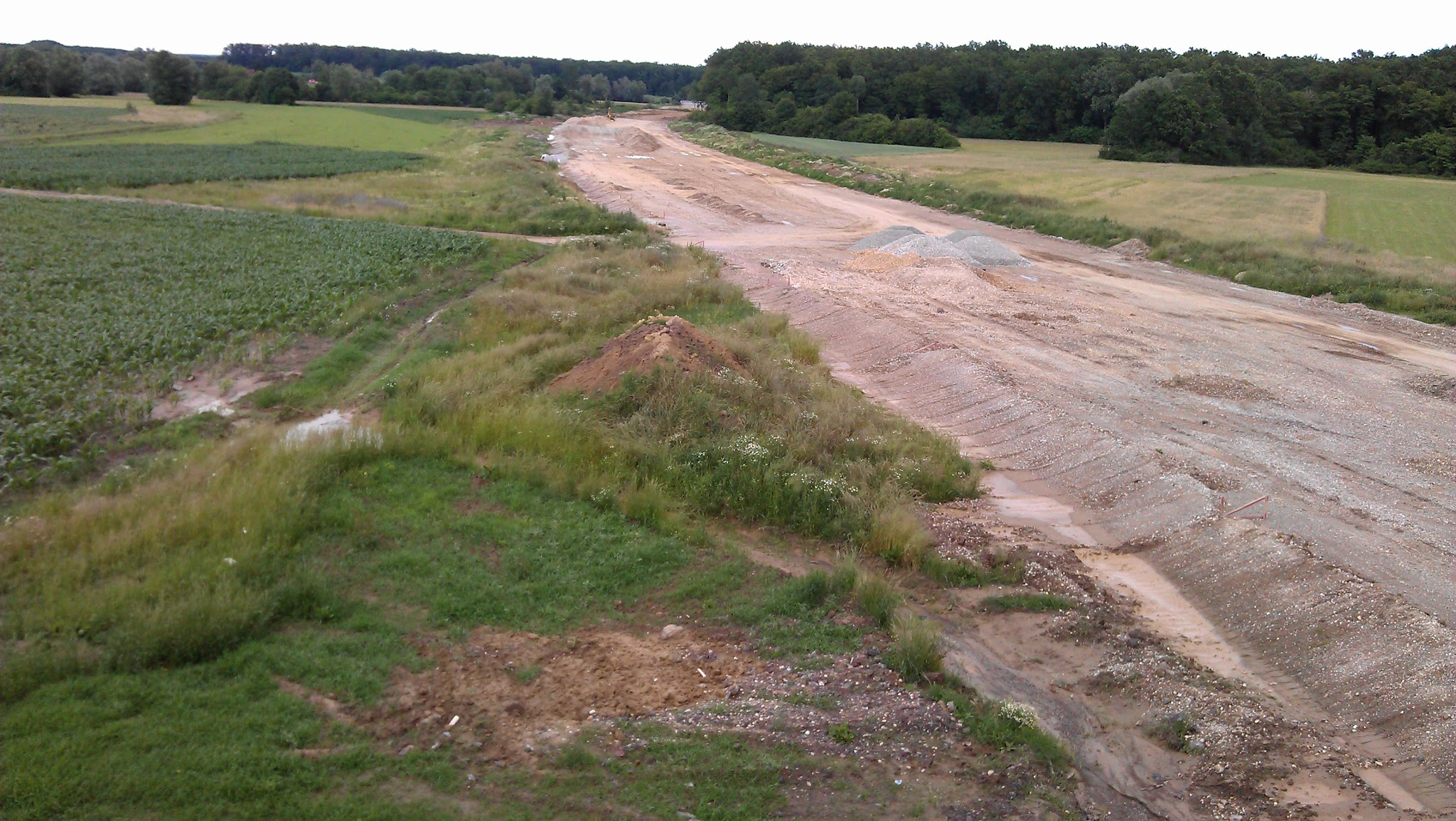
- Haganj, Croatia

- Location within Croatia
- Coordinates: 45°55′N 16°35′E
- Country: Croatia
- County: Zagreb County
- Municipality: Gradec

Area
  - Total: 11.8 km^{2} (4.6 sq mi)

Population (2021)
  - Total: 447
  - Density: 37.9/km^{2} (98.1/sq mi)
- Time zone: UTC+1 (CET)
  - Summer (DST): UTC+2 (CEST)

Haganj is a village in Croatia. It is connected by the D28 highway.
