= Cugovec =

- Village
- Location within Croatia
- Coordinates: 45°55′N 16°31′E
- Country: Croatia
- County: Zagreb County

Area
  - Total: 6.3 km^{2} (2.4 sq mi)

Population (2021)
  - Total: 417
  - Density: 66/km^{2} (170/sq mi)
- Time zone: UTC+1 (CET)
  - Summer (DST): UTC+2 (CEST)

Cugovec is a village in Croatia. It is connected by the D28 highway.
