= Orle, Croatia =

Orle
- Municipality
- Municipality of Orle
- Interactive map of Orle
- Location of Orle in Croatia
- Coordinates: 45°40′48″N 16°13′48″E
- Country: Croatia
- County: Zagreb County

Area
  - Municipality: 58.6 km^{2} (22.6 sq mi)
  - Urban: 2.7 km^{2} (1.0 sq mi)

Population (2021)
  - Municipality: 1,765
  - Density: 30.1/km^{2} (78.0/sq mi)
  - Urban: 71
  - Urban density: 26/km^{2} (68/sq mi)
- Time zone: UTC+1 (Central European Time)
- Vehicle registration: ZG
- Website: opcina-orle.hr

Orle is a village and a municipality ("općina") in Croatia in Zagreb County.

In the 2011 census, there were a total of 1,975 inhabitants in the municipality, in the following settlements:

- Bukevje, population 425
- Čret Posavski, population 91
- Drnek, population 308
- Obed, population 51
- Orle, population 107
- Ruča, population 223
- Stružec Posavski, population 75
- Suša, population 113
- Veleševec, population 430
- Vrbovo Posavsko, population 152

In the same census, an absolute majority were Croats.
