= Orlovac, Nova Rača =

Orlovac
- Village
- Interactive map of Orlovac
- Location within Croatia
- Coordinates: 45.7503468°N 16.9278722°E
- Country: Croatia
- County: Bjelovar-Bilogora County
- Municipality: Nova Rača

Area
  - Total: 3.9 sq mi (10.2 km^{2})

Population (2021)
  - Total: 110
  - Density: 28/sq mi (11/km^{2})
- Time zone: UTC+1 (CET)
  - Summer (DST): UTC+2 (CEST)

Orlovac is a village in Croatia.

== Demographics ==
According to the 2021 census, its population was 110.
