= Veleševec =

Coordinates: 45°39′N 16°16′E

- Village
- Veleševec (Croatia)
- Interactive map of Veleševec
- Country: Croatia

Area
  - Total: 14.1 km^{2} (5.4 sq mi)

Population (2021)
  - Total: 369
  - Density: 26.2/km^{2} (67.8/sq mi)
- Time zone: UTC+1 (CET)
  - Summer (DST): UTC+2 (CEST)

Veleševec is a village in Located in Zagreb County, Croatia. The village lies in the northeastern part of the country, approximately 29 km southeast of the capital city of Zagreb. Veleševec rests at an elevation of 98 meters above sea level, and, according to the 2011 Census, the village is home to a population of 430 residents in 170 households. Administratively, it is part of the municipality of Orle.

The terrain around Veleševec is mostly flat. The highest point nearby is at an elevation of 245 meters, located 18.1 km southwest of Veleševec. There are approximately 80 people per square kilometer in the vicinity of Veleševec, indicating a moderately dense population. The nearest major city is Velika Gorica, situated 16.4 km west of Veleševec. The surrounding area of Veleševec is predominantly rural.

The climate is hemiboreal. The average temperature is 11°C. The hottest month is July, at 22°C, and the coldest is January, at -2°C. Annual rainfall averages 1,474 millimeters per year, with the wettest month being September, with 192 millimeters of rain, and the driest being March, with 88 millimeters.
