= Cirkvena =

Coordinates: 45°56′N 16°40′E

Cirkvena Cirkvena
- Village
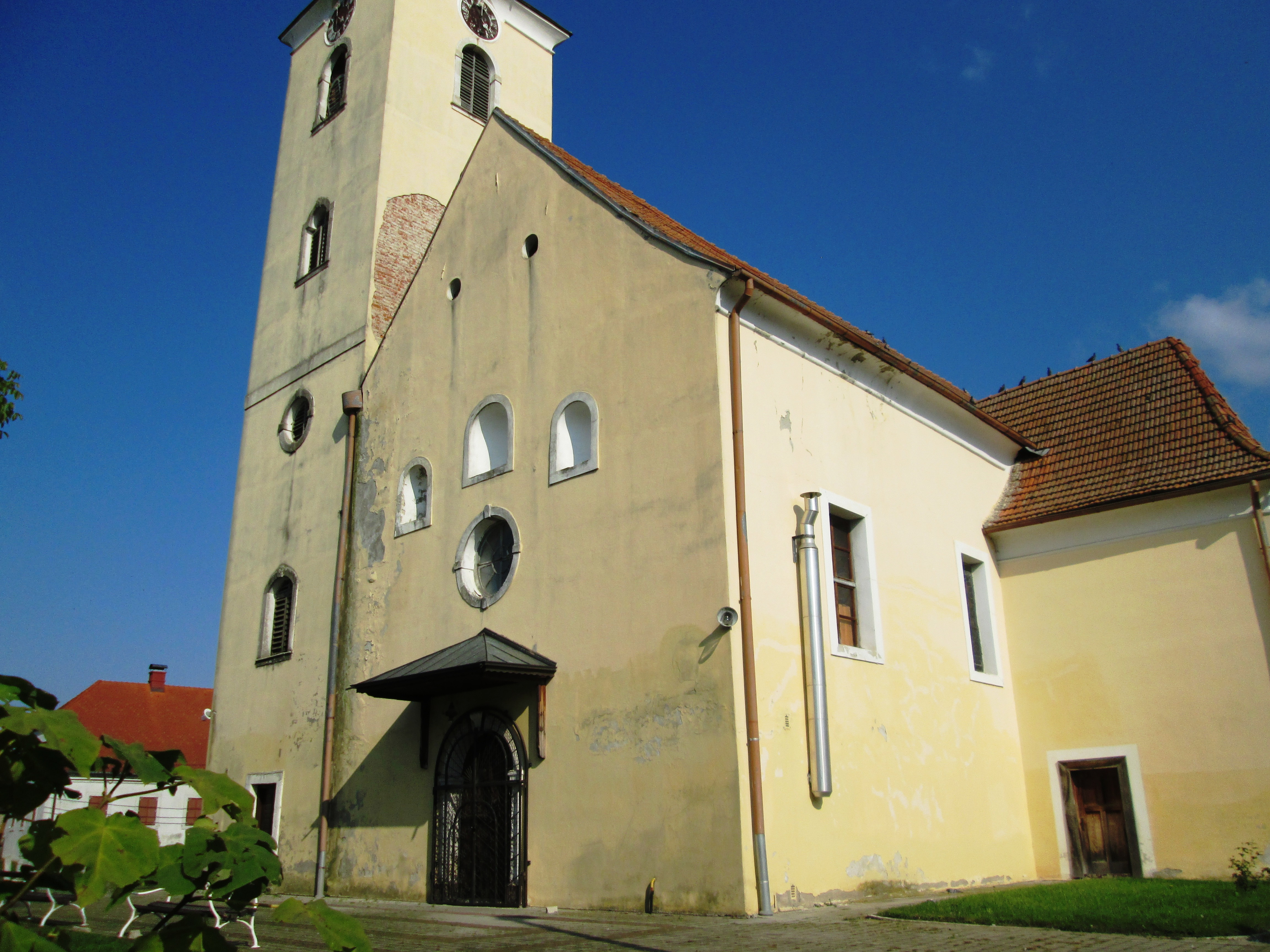
- Church in Cirkvena, Croatia
- Interactive map of Cirkvena
- Country: Croatia
- County: Koprivnica-Križevci County

Area
  - Total: 9.5 km^{2} (3.7 sq mi)

Population (2021)
  - Total: 507
  - Density: 53/km^{2} (140/sq mi)
- Time zone: UTC+1 (CET)
  - Summer (DST): UTC+2 (CEST)

Cirkvena is a village in Croatia.
