= Nova Rača =

- Municipality
- Interactive map of Nova Rača
- Location within Croatia
- Coordinates: 45°48′N 16°57′E
- Country: Croatia
- County: Bjelovar-Bilogora County

Government
  - Mayor: Darko Knežić (HSS)

Area
  - Municipality: 35.8 sq mi (92.8 km^{2})
  - Urban: 1.7 sq mi (4.4 km^{2})

Population (2021)
  - Municipality: 2,756
  - Density: 76.9/sq mi (29.7/km^{2})
  - Urban: 382
  - Urban density: 220/sq mi (87/km^{2})
- Time zone: UTC+1 (CET)
  - Summer (DST): UTC+2 (CEST)
- Website: nova-raca.hr

Nova Rača (historically Racha and Ratcha, old Hungarian name Racsa ), often shortened as just Rača, is a settlement and municipality in Bjelovar-Bilogora County, Croatia.

== Demographics ==
According to the 2021 census, the population of the municipality was 2,756 with 382 living in the town proper. There were 4,077 inhabitants in 2001, of whom 91% were Croats.

In 2021, the municipality consisted of the following settlements:

- Bedenik, population 359
- Bulinac, population 314
- Dautan, population 245
- Drljanovac, population 193
- Kozarevac Račanski, population 103
- Međurača, population 275
- Nevinac, population 172
- Nova Rača, population 382
- Orlovac, population 110
- Sasovac, population 172
- Slovinska Kovačica, population 102
- Stara Rača, population 248
- Tociljevac, population 81
Nova Rača: Population trends 1857–2021
v

population	5361	5919	5894	6307	6762	7447	7198	6482	6573	6664	6483	5705	4882	4520	4077	3433	2756
	1857	1869	1880	1890	1900	1910	1921	1931	1948	1953	1961	1971	1981	1991	2001	2011	2021

Sources: Croatian Bureau of Statistics publications

== Politics ==
=== Minority councils and representatives ===
Directly elected minority councils and representatives are tasked with consulting tasks for the local or regional authorities in which they are advocating for minority rights and interests, integration into public life and participation in the management of local affairs. At the 2023 Croatian national minorities councils and representatives elections Albanians of Croatia fulfilled legal requirements to elect 10 members minority council of the Municipality of Nova Rača but the elections were not organized due to the lack of candidates.
