= D43 road (Croatia) =

Road in Croatia

D43 state road

Route information
- Length: 78.1 km (48.5 mi)

Major junctions
- From: D2 in Đurđevac
- D28 near Letičani and in Bjelovar; D26 in Čazma
- To: A3 in Ivanić Grad interchange

Location
- Country: Croatia
- Counties: Koprivnica-Križevci, Bjelovar-Bilogora, Zagreb County
- Major cities: Đurđevac, Bjelovar, Čazma, Ivanić Grad

Highway system
- Highways in Croatia

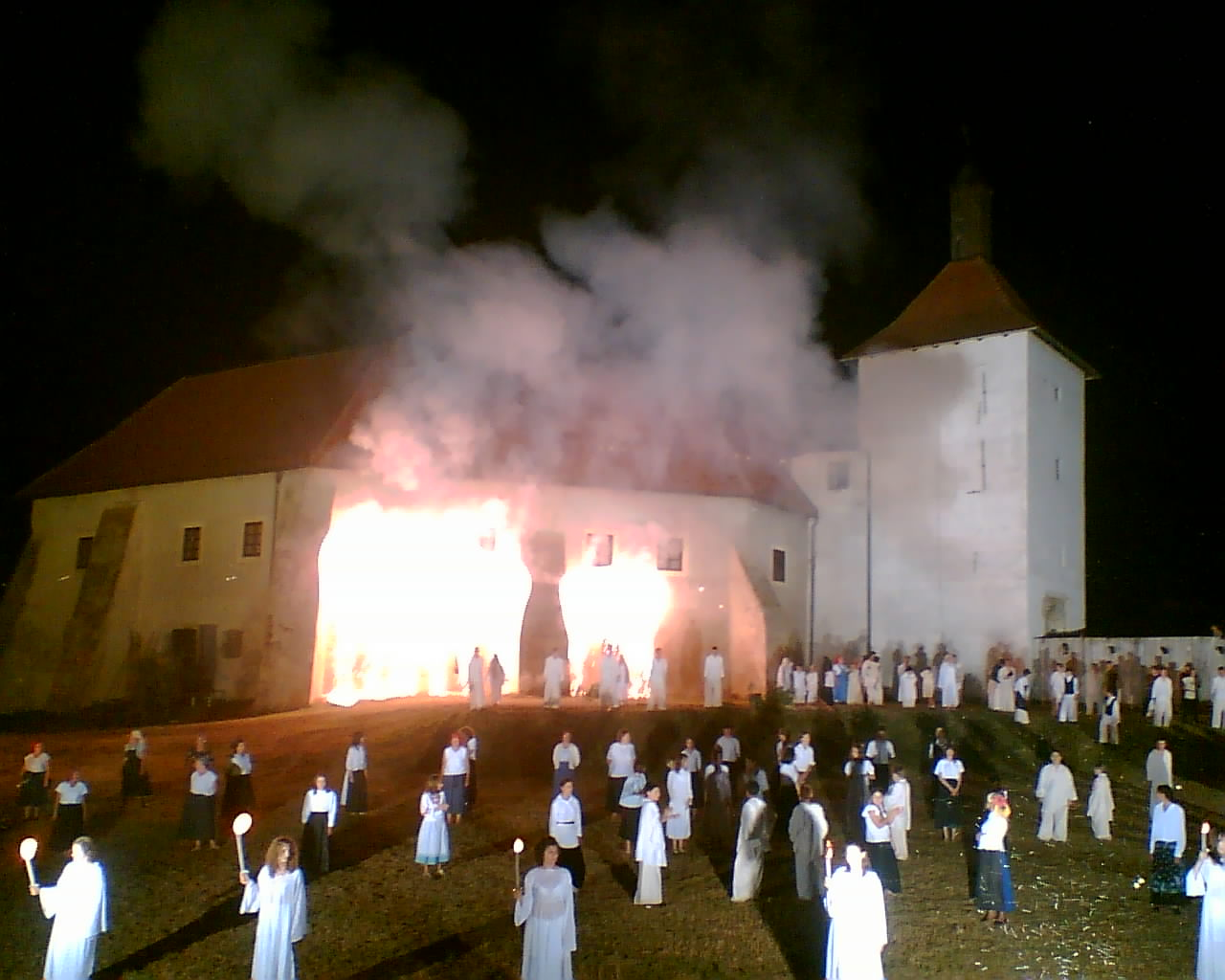
Đurđevac, at the northern terminus of the D43 road

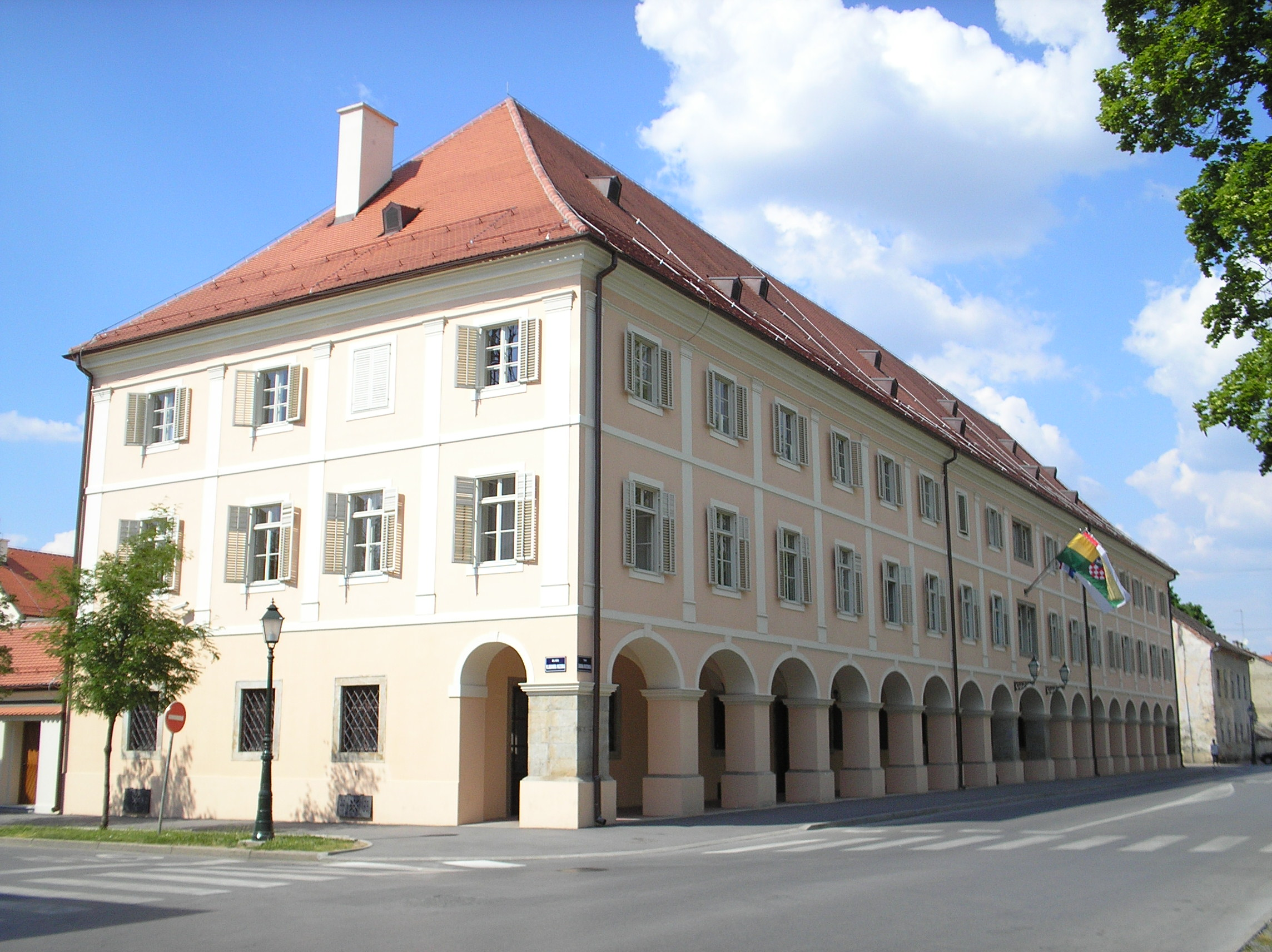
Bjelovar, on the D43 road route

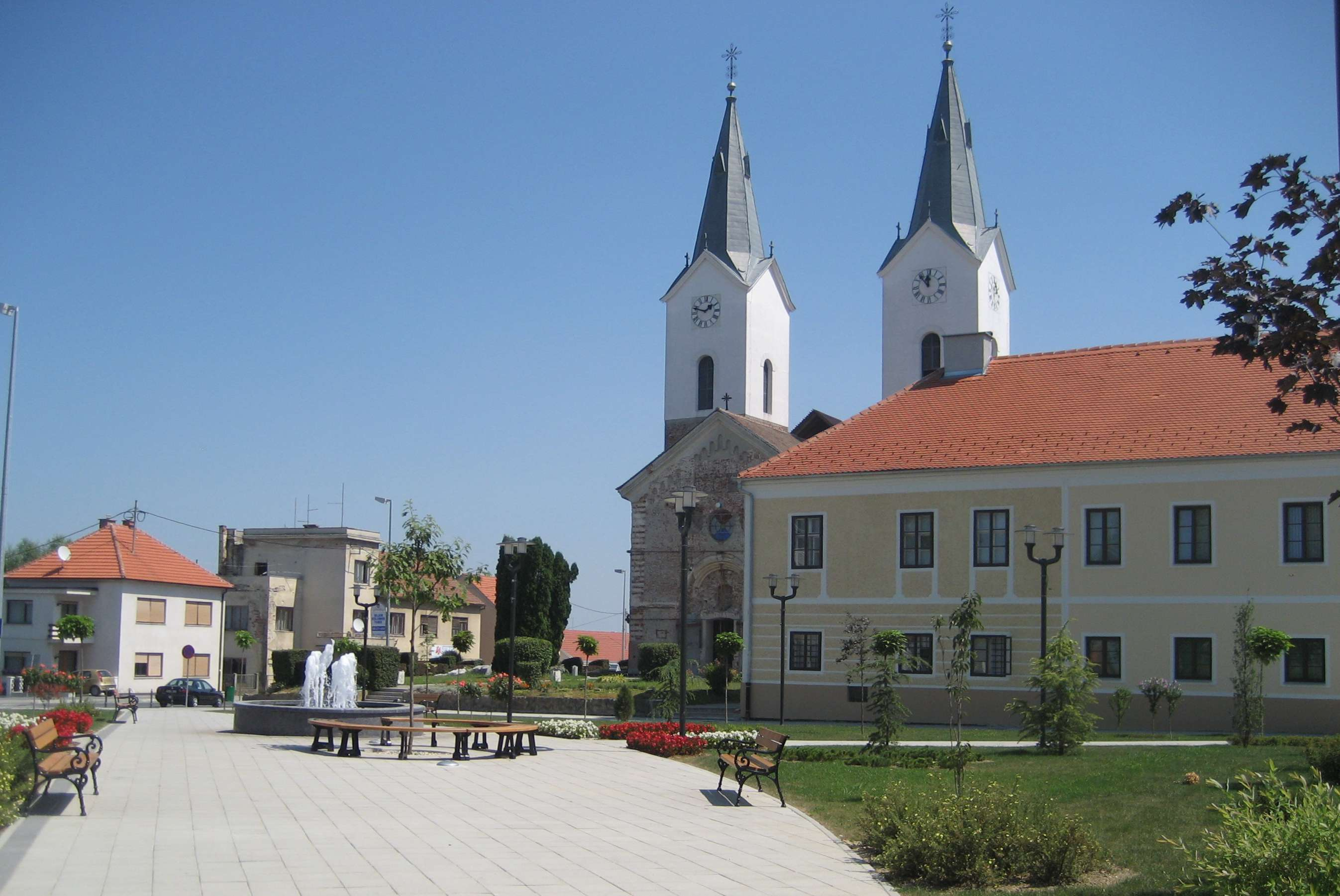
Čazma, on the D43 road route

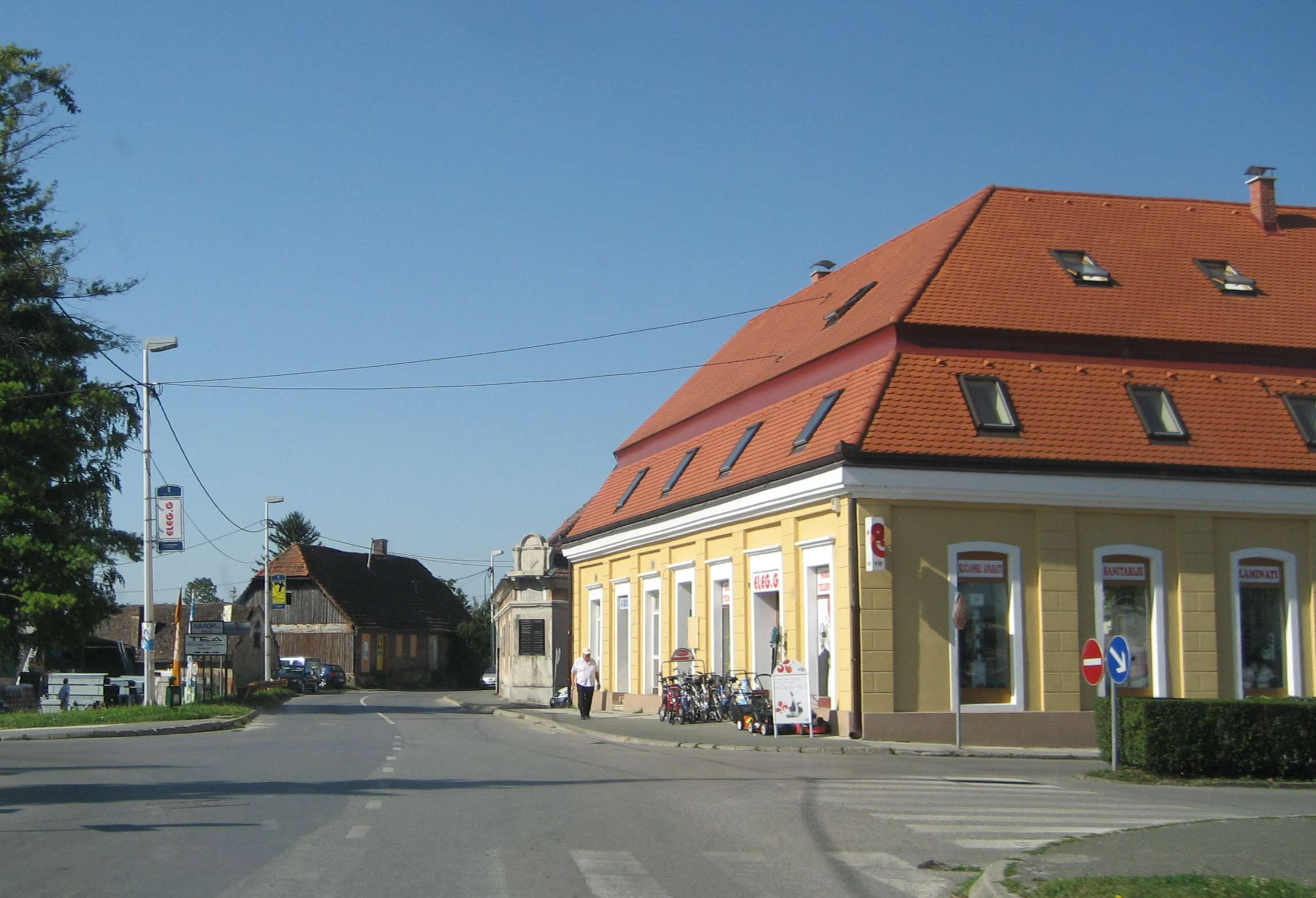
Ivanić Grad, near the southern terminus of the D43 road

D43 is a state road in central Croatia connecting Đurđevac, Bjelovar, Čazma and Ivanić Grad to the A3 motorway at its southern terminus, within Ivanić Grad interchange. The road is 78.1 km (48.5 mi) long.

The D43, like all other state roads in Croatia, is managed and maintained by Hrvatske ceste, state owned company.

== Traffic volume ==
Traffic is regularly counted and reported by Hrvatske ceste, operator of the road.

D43 traffic volume
Road	Counting site	AADT	ASDT	Notes
D43	1314 Hampovica	3,218	3,549	Adjacent to the Ž3049 junction.
D43	2105 Markovac	2,363	2,461	Adjacent to the D28 junction.
D43	2108 Narta - north	3,674	3,650	Adjacent to the Ž3084 junction.
D43	2015 Caginec	7,025	7,351	Between the Ž3074 and Ž3124 junctions.

== Road junctions and populated areas ==
D43 junctions/populated areas
Type	Slip roads/Notes
	Đurđevac; D2 to Koprivnica (D20) and Varaždin (D3) (to the west) and to Virovitica (D5) (to the east). The northern terminus of the road.
	Šemovci; Ž2183 to Virje (D2).
	Hampovica
	Ž3049 to Ćurlovac and Remetovac (the road loops to Ćurlovac and back to the D3 forming two junctions with the latter).
	Ž2236 to Babotok, Donje Zdjelice, Miholjanec and Virje (D2).
	Kupinovac
	D28 to Sveti Ivan Žabno and D10 expressway Gradec interchange (to the west). The D28 and D43 are concurrent to the south.
	Letičani
	Trojstveni Markovac
	Bjelovar; D28 to Veliki Grđevac and Veliki Zdenci (D5) (to the east). The D28 and D43 are concurrent to the north.
	Ž3084 to Paljevine, Ivanska and Berek.
	Narta
	Štefanje; Ž3081 to Ivanska. Ž3283 to Zdenčec and Sišćani.
	Daskatica
	Vagovina
	Gornji Draganec; Ž2231 to Sišćani, Farkaševac, Crikvena and Kenđelovac (D28).
	Čazma; D26 to D10 expressway Dubrava interchange (to the west) and to Garešnica (D45) and Daruvar (D5) (to the east). Ž3128 to Rečica Kriška.
	Bosiljevo
	Palančani
	Dapci
	Ž3284 to Sovari, Marčani, Donji Lipovčani and Cerina (D26).
	Šumećani
	Graberje Ivaničko; Ž3124 to Bunjani, Voloder, Kutina (D45) and Novska (D47). Ž3125 to Deanovec
	Caginec; Ž3074 to Kloštar Ivanić and Lupoglav.
	Ivanić Grad; Ž3123 within the town to the Ž3041.
	A3 motorway Ivanić Grad interchange to Zagreb (to the west) and to Slavonski Brod (to the east).
