= 1938 Bilogora earthquake =

- Location within Croatia
- UTC time: 1938-03-27 11:16:26
- ISC event
- USGS-ANSS: ComCat
- Local date: March 27, 1938
- Local time: 12:15 (CET)
- Magnitude: 5.9 M_{w}
- Epicenter: 46.277°N 16.951°E
- Areas affected: Bilogora, Podravina
- Total damage: material damage
- Max. intensity: MMI VII (Very strong)
- Aftershocks: several

The 1938 Bilogora earthquake occurred on March 27, 1938 on the Bilogora mountain in the Podravina region of northwestern Croatia, 7 km east-southeast of the Legrad, with a magnitude of 5.9 on the Moment magnitude scale (M_{w}). Over the next month, there were another five weaker earthquakes in the area.

== Damages ==
In the village of Rakitnica, 26 houses were destroyed, the same number were damaged, and only one building out of a total of 80 remained intact. The villages of Šemovci and Kegljevac suffered somewhat less, but very badly, and Hampovica, located in the middle of these places, miraculously survived best. The bell tower collapsed and a large part of the church of St. Mary Magdalene in Kapela was destroyed. The bell tower was only repaired in 2017, after numerous unsuccessful attempts.

The following were particularly damaged: Koprivnica, Virje, Kloštar Podravski, Novigrad Podravski, Koprivnički Bregi, Đurđevac, also Bjelovar and Virovitica. There were no human casualties. It was felt very strongly in Zagreb, Varaždin (damaged a school building there), Virovitica and elsewhere.

The then Đurđevac parish priest Jakov Novosel wrote that the earthquake occurred at 12:15 p.m. and that it caused a lot of damage in Podravina, with houses destroyed, chimneys collapsed and walls cracked. The Old Town in Đurđevac was damaged, and the plaster of the then new St. George parish church fell off. The earthquake and its consequences were also reported in newspapers at the time.
