= D524 road =

Road in Croatia

D524 state road

Route information
- Length: 8.5 km (5.3 mi)

Major junctions
- From: D43 north of Bjelovar
- To: D28 west of Bjelovar

Location
- Country: Croatia
- Counties: Bjelovar-Bilogora
- Major cities: Bjelovar

Highway system
- Highways in Croatia

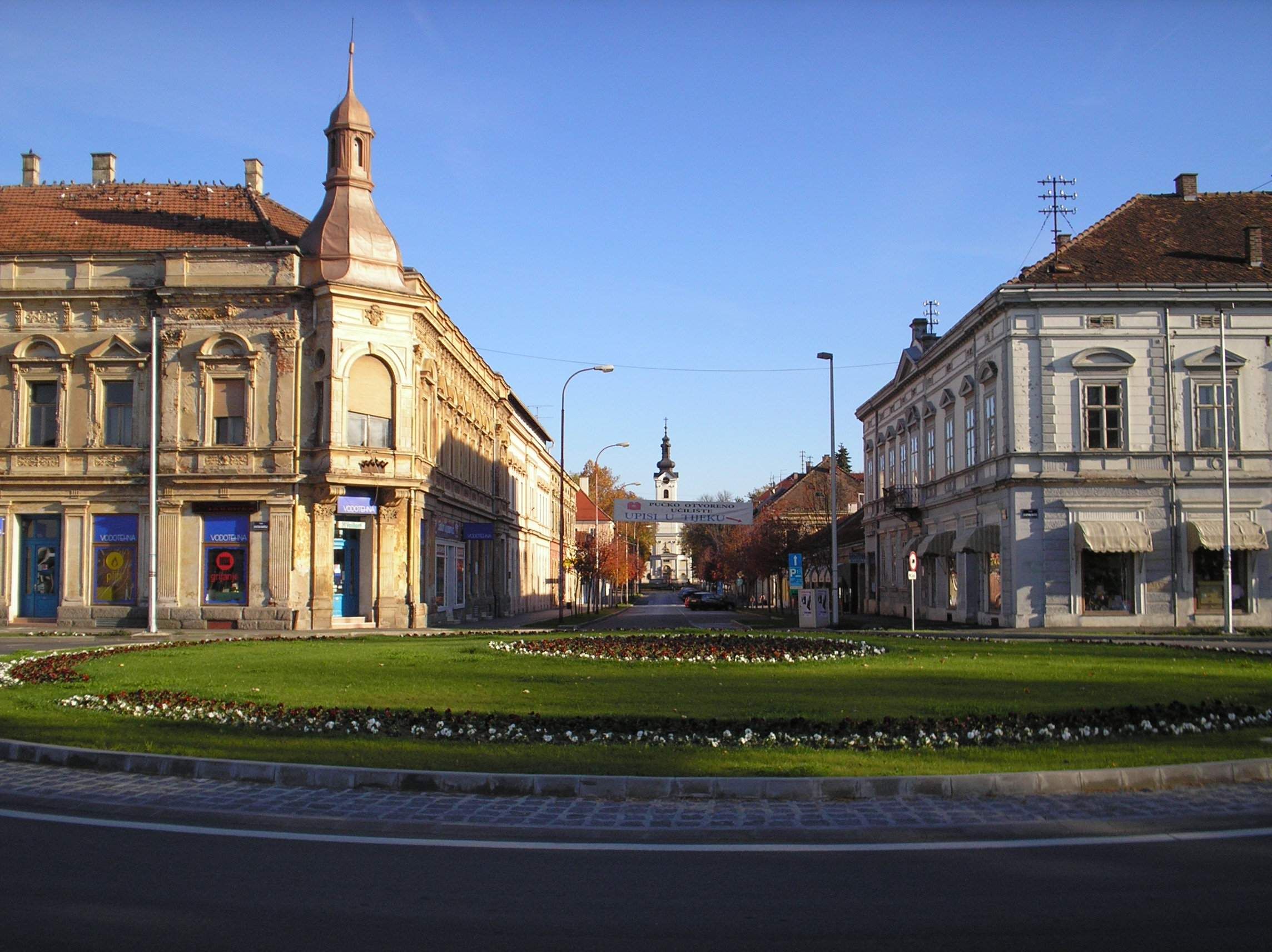
Bjelovar, bypassed by the D524 road

D524 is a state road in central Croatia connecting the D28 in Predavac and the D43 near Letičani, comprising the northern bypass of the city of Bjelovar. The road is 8.5 km (5.3 mi) long.

This and all other state roads in Croatia are managed and maintained by Hrvatske ceste, a state-owned company.

== Traffic volume ==
Traffic is regularly counted and reported by Hrvatske ceste, operator of the road.

D524 traffic volume
Road	Counting site	AADT	ASDT	Notes
D524	2104 Bjelovar bypass	4,155	4,625	Adjacent to the D28 junction.

== Road junctions and populated areas ==
D524 junctions/populated areas
Type	Slip roads/Notes
	D43 to Đurđevac (D2) (to the north) and to Bjelovar (to the south). The eastern terminus of the road.
	Ž2143 to Novi Skucani (to the north) and to Bjelovar (D28) (to the south).
	Ž3024 to Plavnice Gornje (to the north) and to Bjelovar (D43) (to the south).
	Predavac; D28 to Sveti Ivan Žabno (D22) (to the west) and to Bjelovar (to the southeast). The western terminus of the road.

== See also ==
- State roads in Croatia
- Hrvatske ceste
