= Croatian Publishing and Bibliographic Institute =

Lecicographic institute

The Croatian Publishing and Bibliographic Institute (Croatian: Hrvatski izdavalački bibliografski zavod, HIBZ) was a lexicographic institute in the Independent State of Croatia founded on August 9, 1941. Mate Ujević was its director. In 1944, Dragutin Tadijanović became the literary secretary of the institute. With the creation of communist Yugoslavia in 1945, the institute's work was stopped.

People associated with the Institute include Ivan Goran Kovačić.

The Institute published the Dictionary of Croatian Literary Language, as well as taking over the publishing of the Croatian Encyclopedia. In 1942, the institute published seven of Vladimir Nazor's works: Putopisi, Zagrebačke novele, Posljednja Trijada, Na vrh jezika i pera, Arhanđeli, Knjiga pjesama and Eseji i članci.

== Published works ==
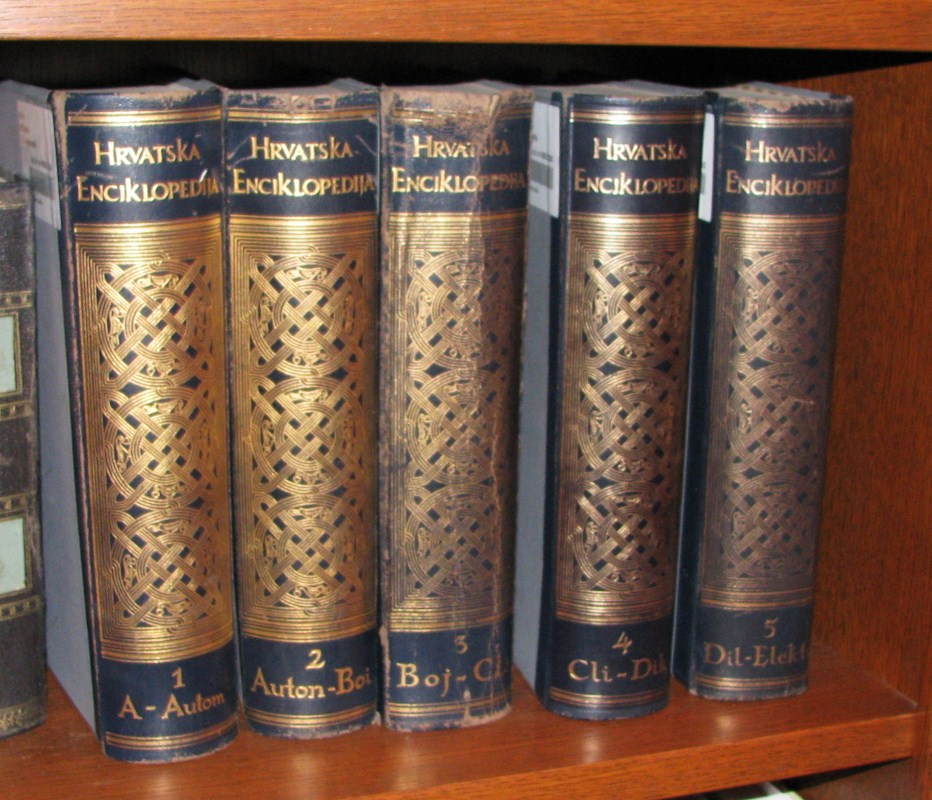
Four of five volumes of Croatian Encyclopedia were published by the Institute between 1941 and 1945.

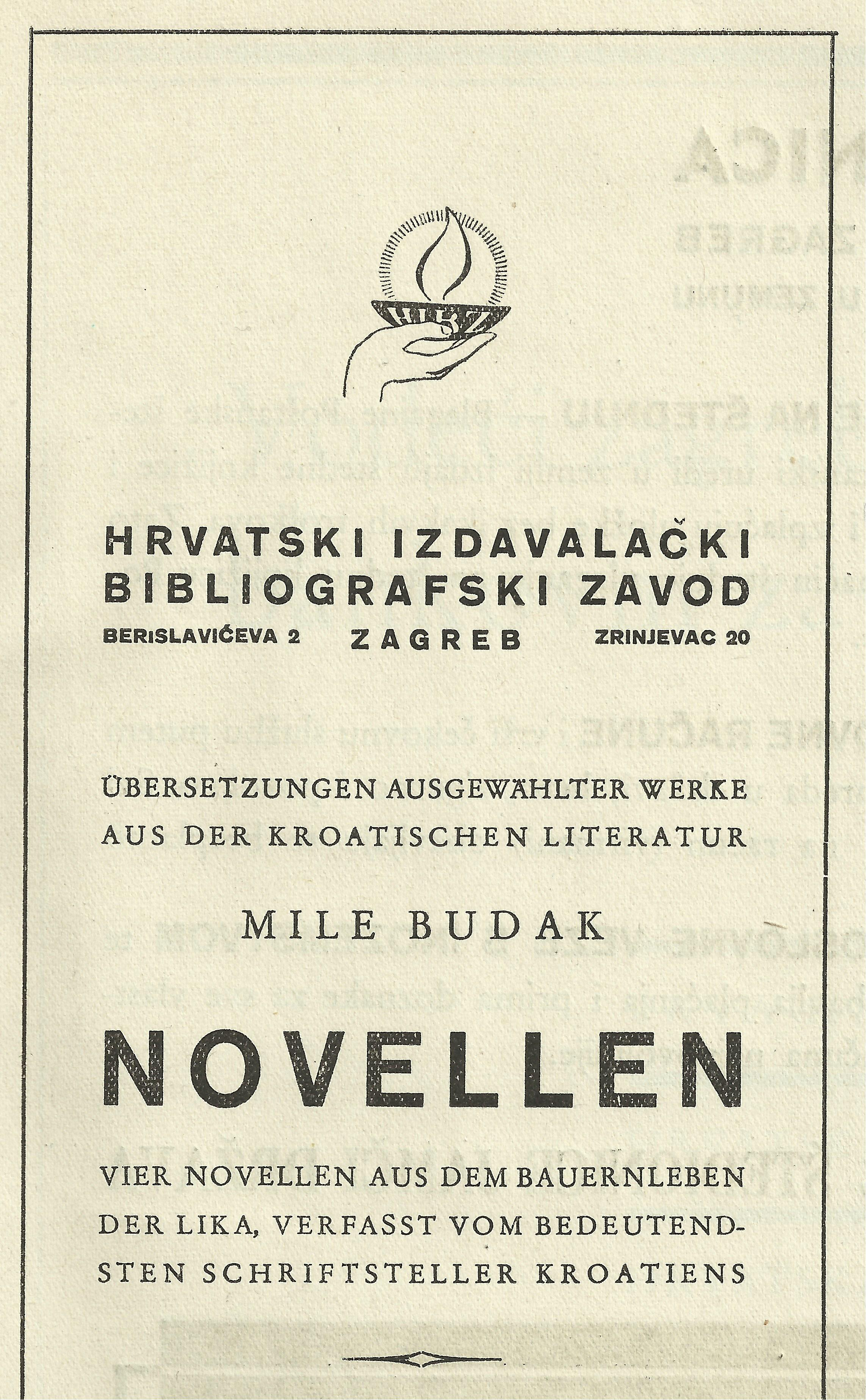
A German-language translation of Mile Budak's novellas was published by the institute in 1942.

=== Contemporary Croatian Writers series ===
The HIBZ published a series of anthologies titled Contemporary Croatian Writers (Suvremeni hrvatski pisci):

- Book 1: Tuga zemlje, Dragutin Tadijanović (1942)
- Book 2: Izabrani stihovi, Dobriša Cesarić (1942)
- Book 3: Pjesme I., Đuro Sudeta (1943)
- Book 4: Pjesme II., Đuro Sudeta (1943)
- Book 5: Kritike i članci, Julije Benešić (1943)
- Book 6: Kritike i prikazi, Milan Begović (1943)
- Book 9: Za kasnim stolom, Nikola Šop (1943)
- Book 10: Tajanstvena prela, Nikola Šop (1943)
- Book 12: Pjesme, Ljubo Wiesner (1943)
- Book 18: Pripoviesti, Janko Leskovar (1944)

=== Fran Galović ===
- Drame 1 (1903–1906), Fran Galović. Zagreb, 1942.
- Drame 2 (1907), Fran Galović. Zagreb, 1942.
- Drame 3 (1908), Fran Galović. Zagreb, 1942.
- Drame 4 (1908–1911), Fran Galović. Zagreb, 1942.
- Drame 5 (1912–1913), Fran Galović. Zagreb, 1942.
- Pjesme 2, Fran Galović. Zagreb, 1942.
- Pripovijesti 1 (1903–1912), Fran Galović. Zagreb, 1942.
- Pripovijesti 2 (1912–1914), Fran Galović. Zagreb, 1942.
- Članci i kritike (1902–1914), Fran Galović. Zagreb, 1942.

=== Other books ===
- Dioba vlasti, Ivo Krbek. Zagreb, 1943.
- Prošlost Dalmacije I–II., Grga Novak. Zagreb, 1944.
- Tamnica vremena, Gustav Krklec. Zagreb, 1944.

=== Periodicals ===
Croatia, 1941–1944
Književni tjednik

Književni tjednik ("Literary Weekly") was a literary and cultural magazine. Its Editor-in-Chief was Pavao Tijan. In six months, between 18 December 1941 and 28 June 1942, 21 issues were published, initially weekly and later biweekly. The magazine's topics were literature, newly released books, theater, concerts, fine arts, and photography. Foreign literature and writers, such as Albanian, Belgian, Bengali, Norwegian and French, received coverage too. The magazine published a number of poems and pieces of short prose by contemporary Croatian writers, including Tin Ujević, Vladimir Nazor, Ivan Goran Kovačić and Vjekoslav Kaleb. It was discontinued in 1942, ostensibly due to a "shortage of paper". According to Mate Ujević, the real reason was an unspecified article deemed "anti-fascist" by the regime. It appears that the authorities decided to extinguish Književni tjednik in order to set the stage for Spremnost, a political weekly closely aligned with Ustasha ideology. During the communist era in post-World War II Yugoslavia, Književni tjednik was not available for academic research.

Časopis za hrvatsku poviest

Časopis za hrvatsku poviest ("Journal of Croatian History") was the first exclusively historical journal in Croatian historiography. It covered only topics related to history and art history of Croatia. Its editors were Miho Barada, a historian, and Ljubo Karaman, an art historian and conservator. Four issues in three volumes were published in 1943.

Vienac

After the demise of Književni tjednik, HIBZ started Vienac ("The Wreath"), a monthly magazine that continued the tradition of Vienac, a publication of Matica ilirska established in 1869 and discontinued before World War I. Between March and July 1944, 12 issues were published in 6 volumes. The Editor-in-Chief was Julije Benešić. Although Vienac was predominantly a literary magazine, it covered a wide range of topics, including fine arts, philosophy, economy, and natural sciences. Some articles attracted public criticism in pro-regime publications, which, according to Mate Ujević, nearly led to HIBZ being terminated.

Časopis za medicinu i biologiju (Acta medico-biologica croatica)

Acta was envisioned as a quarterly medical journal, but only a single issue was published in early 1945. Its editor was Juraj Körbler, and the chairman of its editorial board was Ante Šercer.

== Bibliography ==
- Macut, Ivan (2016). "Filozofske teme i filozofi u tjedniku Spremnost (1942. – 1945.)" (PDF). Služba Božja (in Croatian). 56 (2–3–4): 159–188.
- Matičević, Ivica (2007). Prostor slobode - književna kritika u zagrebačkoj periodici od 1941. do 1945. Zagreb: Matica hrvatska. ISBN 9789531508100.
- Sorokin, Branka (2004). "Časopisi Hrvatskoga izdavalačkog bibliografskog zavoda" [Journals of the Croatian Publishing and Bibliographic Institute] (PDF). Vjesnik Bibliotekara Hrvatske (in Croatian). 47 (1–2). Zagreb: Croatian Library Association: 43–60.
- Švab, Mladen (1992). "Mate Ujević, utemeljitelj suvremene hrvatske enciklopedike" [Mate Ujević, the founder of contemporary Croatian encyclopaedism]. Radovi Leksikografskoga zavoda "Miroslav Krleža" (in Croatian). 2. Zagreb: Miroslav Krleža Institute of Lexicography: 9–73. Archived from the original (PDF) on 3 January 2019.
- Tahirović, Husref; Tahirović, Elnur (May 2018). "Medical Journals in Bosnia and Herzegovina from 1878 to 1945" (PDF). Acta Medica Academica. 47 (1). Sarajevo: Department of Medical Sciences of the Academy of Sciences and Arts of Bosnia and Herzegovina: 94–101. doi:10.5644/ama2006-124.220. PMID 29957977.
- Ujević, Mate (18 May 1945). "Hrvatski izdavalački bibliografski zavod" (PDF) (in Croatian). Zagreb. Archived from the original (PDF) on 3 January 2019.
