= Blatnica =

Blatnica can refer to:

- Blatnica, Slovakia
- Blatnica, Bjelovar-Bilogora County, a village near Štefanje, Croatia
- Blatnica Pokupska, a village near Karlovac, Croatia
- Blatnica (Čitluk), a village in the municipality of Čitluk, Bosnia and Herzegovina

== See also ==
- Blatnick
