= Șișcani =

Şişcani may refer to several places:

- Şişcani, a village in Hoceni Commune, Vaslui County, Romania
- Şişcani, a district in the city of Adjud, Vrancea County, Romania
- Şişcani, a commune in Raionul Nisporeni, Moldova
- Sišćani, a village in Bjelovar-Bilogora County, Croatia
