= Tijan (name) =

Tijan is both a given name and a surname. Notable people with the name include:

- Tijan Jaiteh (born 1988), Gambian footballer
- Tijan Marei (born 1996), German actress
- Tijan Sallah (born 1958), Gambian poet
- Tijan Sonha (born 2001), Spanish footballer
- Ahmed Tijan (born 1995), Qatari beach volleyball player
- Pavao Tijan (1908–1997), Croatian encyclopaedist
