= Đuro Šurmin =

Croatian literary historian and politician

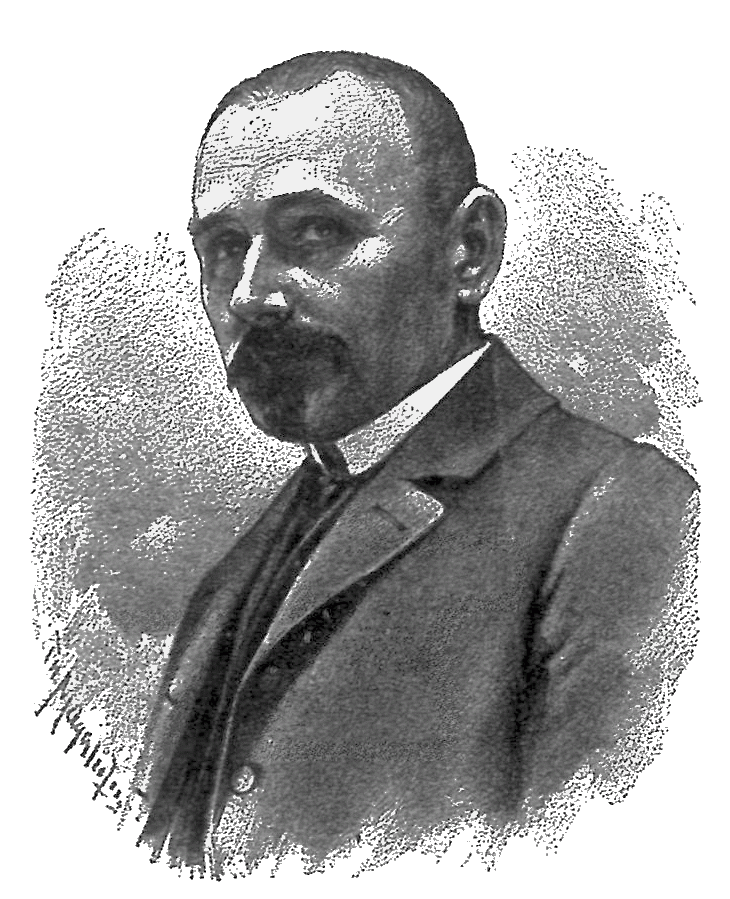
- Šurmin, c. 1907
- Born: 4 September 1867; Sišćani, Croatian Military Frontier, Austria-Hungary (now Sišćani, Croatia)
- Died: 22 March 1937 (aged 69); Zagreb, Kingdom of Yugoslavia (now Zagreb, Croatia)
- Occupations: writer, teacher, politician

Đuro Šurmin (4 September 1867 – 22 March 1937) was a Croatian literary historian and politician.

== Biography ==
He was born in Sišćani. He studied Slavic Studies, Classical Studies, and philosophy at the Faculty of Philosophy in Zagreb since 1890, receiving a Ph.D. in 1897 with a thesis titled Riječi muškoga roda â-osnova u hrvatskom jeziku (Â-stem Words of Masculine Gender in Croatian). There, he worked as a teaching apprentice in Croatian and Serbian literature beginning in 1899, becoming a regular professor in 1906, and then serving as the dean between 1907 and 1908. In 1908, he temporarily retired, in 1910 reemployed, and, in 1921, permanently retired. He died in Zagreb in 1937.

== Political engagement ==
Šurmin was actively involved in politics. Since 1906 he served as a parliamentarian for the Croatian People's Progressive Party, supporting the Croat-Serb Coalition until 1917. In 1914–1922 he was the city councilor of Zagreb. In the National Council of the Kingdom of Serbs, Croats and Slovenes he belonged to the non-partisan group of politicians who rallied around the newspapers Male novine, serving as a commissioner for commerce, trade and industry. In the Kingdom of Serbs, Croats and Slovenes he was originally a member of the Advanced Democratic Party, then in the period 1919–1924 as member of the Croatian Community, and finally in 1925 founding the uninfluential Croatian People's Party. In 1920 he was elected to the Constituent Assembly and served as the Minister for Social Affairs, and also later as the Minister of Trade and Industry (1924–1925). His political activity in the 1930s was tied with the regime. He was particularly active in various economic bodies, such as being the President of the People's Bank for Savings and Loans in 1925–1935.

== Work ==
Miroslav Šicel published a bibliography of Šurmin's works in 2005, but the most extensive bibliography was published by Lidija Bogović within the 2017 monograph on Šurmin, which also included Josipa Dragičević's bibliography of literature on Šurmin.

His scientific work was in the fields of history of literature, history and philology:

- Povjest književnosti hrvatske i srpske (History of Croatian and Serbian Literature, 1898)
- Iz zajedničke književne prošlosti Bosne i Slavonije (From the Common Literary Past of Bosnia and Slavonia, 1901)
- Hrvatski preporod I–II (Croatian Revival, 1903–1904)
- Stvaranje Srbije (The Creation of Serbia, 1921)
- Osnovke ugovora u Londonu 1915. (The Principles of the 1915 Treaty of London, 1928)
- Vojska i hrvatska politika 1915. god. (The Army and Croatian Politics in 1915, 1932)

As part of the Monumenta historico-juridica Slavorum meridionalium project he prepared a collection of medieval, predominantly Glagolitic monuments, which were published as Hrvatski spomenici (Croatian Monuments, 1898). His legacy is preserved in the Croatian State Archives in Zagreb.
