= Stanići =

Stanići may refer to:

- Stanići, Bosnia and Herzegovina, a village near Derventa
- Stanići, Split-Dalmatia County, a village near Omiš, Croatia
- Stanići, Bjelovar-Bilogora County, a village near Kapela, Croatia

== See also ==
- Stanić
