= Višnjevac =

Višnjevac may refer to:

- Višnjevac, Osijek-Baranja County, a village near Osijek, Croatia
- Višnjevac, Bjelovar-Bilogora County, a village near Veliko Trojstvo, Croatia
- Višnjevac, Serbia, a village near Subotica, Serbia
