= Narta =

Narta may refer to:

- Narta, Croatia, village in Bjelovar-Bilogora County, Croatia
- Nartë, also known as Narta, village near Vlorë, Albania
- Narta Lagoon, lagoon in Albania near Nartë
