= Sudeta =

Sudeta may refer to:

- Sudetes, Czech mountain range
- Đuro Sudeta, Croatian writer
