= Blatnik =

Blatnik is a surname. Notable people with the surname include:

- Al Blatnik (1923–2011), American football and basketball coach
- Andrej Blatnik (born 1963), Slovene writer
- Gregor Blatnik (born 1972), Slovenian retired international footballer
- John Blatnik (1911–1991), United States Congressman from Minnesota
- Johnny Blatnik (1921–2004), American professional baseball outfielder
- Tatiana Blatnik, birth name of Princess Tatiana of Greece and Denmark (born 1980)
- Thais Blatnik (1919–2015), American journalist

== See also ==
- Blahnik
- Blatnick
