= Križic =

- Village
- Location within Croatia
- Coordinates: 45.7657649°N 16.7620787°E
- Country: Croatia
- County: Bjelovar-Bilogora County
- Municipality: Ivanska

Area
  - Total: 2.1 sq mi (5.4 km^{2})

Population (2021)
  - Total: 148
  - Density: 71/sq mi (27/km^{2})
- Time zone: UTC+1 (CET)
  - Summer (DST): UTC+2 (CEST)

Križic is a village in Croatia.

== Demographics ==
According to the 2021 census, its population was 148.
