= Šiptari, Kapela =

Šiptari
- Village
- Location within Croatia
- Coordinates: 45.9534587°N 16.793425°E
- Country: Croatia
- County: Bjelovar-Bilogora County
- Municipality: Kapela

Area
  - Total: 0.69 sq mi (1.8 km^{2})

Population (2021)
  - Total: 69
  - Density: 99/sq mi (38/km^{2})
- Time zone: UTC+1 (CET)
  - Summer (DST): UTC+2 (CEST)

Šiptari is a village in Croatia.

== Demographics ==
According to the 2021 census, its population was 69.
