= Gornji Mosti =

- Village
- Location within Croatia
- Coordinates: 46.0741794°N 16.8333289°E
- Country: Croatia
- County: Bjelovar-Bilogora County
- Municipality: Kapela

Area
  - Total: 2.9 sq mi (7.5 km^{2})

Population (2021)
  - Total: 51
  - Density: 18/sq mi (6.8/km^{2})
- Time zone: UTC+1 (CET)
  - Summer (DST): UTC+2 (CEST)

Gornji Mosti is a village in Croatia.

== Demographics ==
According to the 2021 census, its population was 51.
