= Đuro Sudeta =

Đuro Sudeta (Stara Plošćica near Bjelovar, April 10, 1903 — Koprivnica, April 30, 1927) was a Croatian writer.

After finishing the gymnasium in Zagreb, in 1922 he started working as a teacher at the civil school in Virje. Ever since the summer 1925, he fought tuberculosis, treating it in Topolšica, Zagreb and Koprivnica. In his brief lifetime he published two books of poetry: Osamljenim stazama ("By lonesome paths") and Kućice u Dolu ("Little houses in Dol"). He also wrote several novels and feuilletons.

Sudeta is a poet of dusky sentiments, rain, anxiety, disease and perishing, but he is want of the Sun, vivacity, spring and harmony, confronted with brutal reality of patient's deathbed. Sudeta is a lyric abounding with straightforwardness, creator of a divine religious inspiration, seeking for comfort of the solitude and the redemption in the idyllic quietude of snow-white churches.

Among the myriad of short stories he wrote, modern lyrical-fantastic novel Mor can be singled out. He also wrote poems, magazine articles and political discussions in Luč, Hrvatska prosvjeta and Vijenac.
