= Sredice Gornje =

- Village
- Location within Croatia
- Coordinates: 46.0375364°N 16.7703094°E
- Country: Croatia
- County: Bjelovar-Bilogora County
- Municipality: Kapela

Area
  - Total: 5.3 sq mi (13.6 km^{2})

Population (2021)
  - Total: 113
  - Density: 21.5/sq mi (8.31/km^{2})
- Time zone: UTC+1 (CET)
  - Summer (DST): UTC+2 (CEST)

Sredice Gornje is a village in Croatia.

== Demographics ==
According to the 2021 census, its population was 113.
