= Gornji Draganec =

- Village
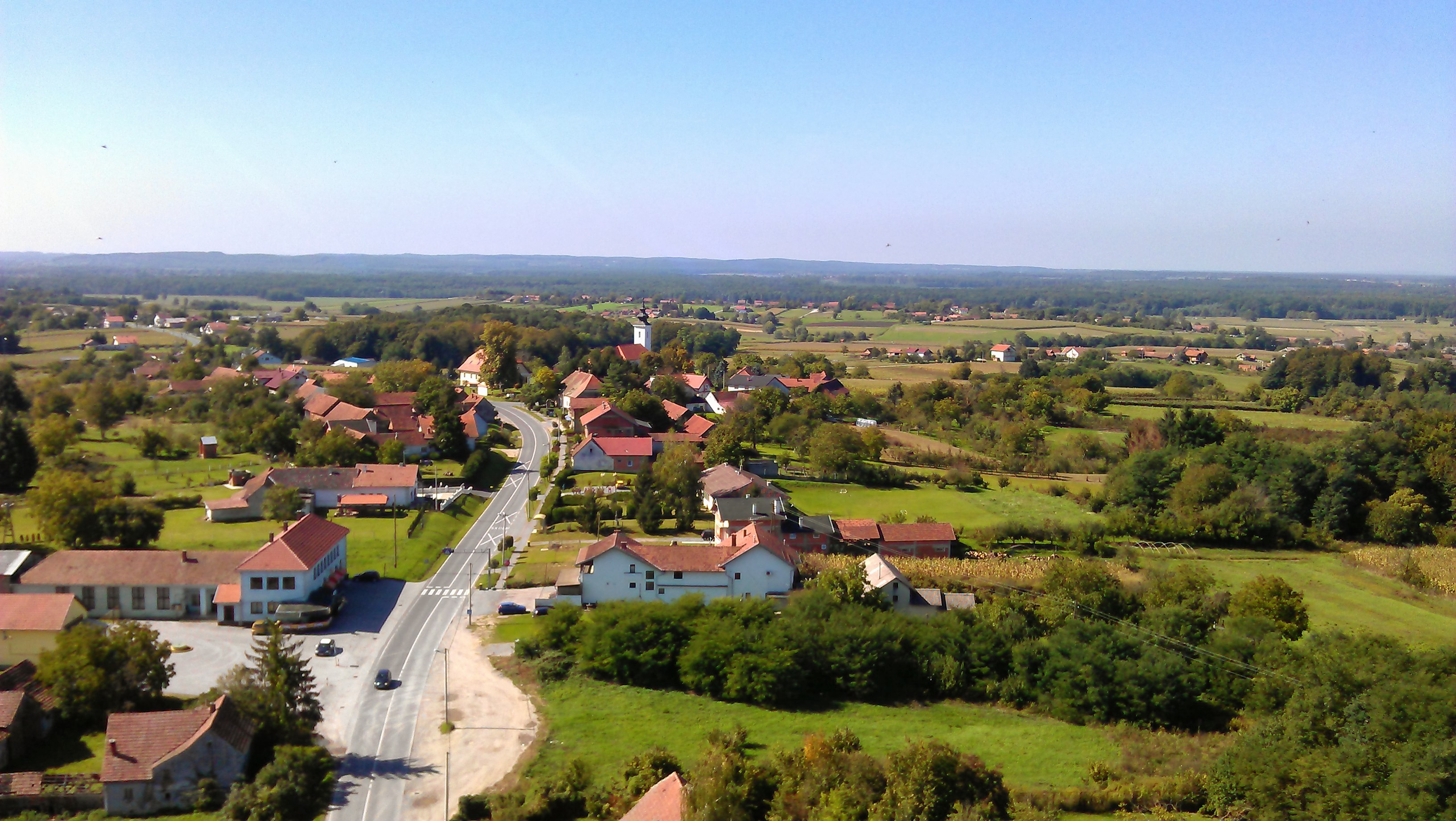
- Aerial view of Gornji Draganec

- Location within Croatia
- Country: Croatia
- County: Bjelovar-Bilogora County
- Municipality: Čazma

Area
  - Total: 1.7 sq mi (4.5 km^{2})

Population (2021)
  - Total: 318
  - Density: 180/sq mi (71/km^{2})
- Time zone: UTC+1 (CET)
  - Summer (DST): UTC+2 (CEST)

Gornji Draganec is a village in Croatia. It is connected by the D43 highway.

== Demographics ==
According to the 2021 census, its population was 318.
