= Virje =

Municipality of Croatia

- Interactive map of Virje
- Location within Croatia
- Coordinates: 46°04′01.92″N 16°59′24.00″E
- Country: Croatia
- County: Koprivnica-Križevci County

Government
  - Mayor: Kristina Filipović (HDZ)

Area
  - Total: 78.5 km^{2} (30.3 sq mi)

Population (2021)
  - Total: 3,842
  - Density: 48.9/km^{2} (127/sq mi)
- Time zone: UTC+1 (CET)
  - Summer (DST): UTC+2 (CEST)
- Postal code: 48350 Đurđevac
- Website: virje.hr

Virje is a village and a municipality in the Koprivnica–Križevci County in Croatia.

== History ==
St. Martin of Tours is the patron saint of this municipality.

In the late 19th century and early 20th century, Virje was part of the Bjelovar-Križevci County of the Kingdom of Croatia-Slavonia.

== Demographics ==
In 2021, the municipality had 3,842 residents in the following 6 settlements:

- Donje Zdjelice, population 63
- Hampovica, population 215
- Miholjanec, population 244
- Rakitnica, population 107
- Šemovci, population 402
- Virje, population 2,811
Virje: Population trends 1857–2021
v

population	7649	8855	9667	8745	9035	9013	8655	8152	7349	7153	6791	6543	5849	5435	5197	4587	3842
	1857	1869	1880	1890	1900	1910	1921	1931	1948	1953	1961	1971	1981	1991	2001	2011	2021

Sources: Croatian Bureau of Statistics publications

== Administration ==
The current mayor of Virje is Kristina Filipović (HDZ) and the Virje Municipal Council consists of 13 seats.

Groups	Councilors per group
HDZ	5 / 13
Independents	5 / 13
SDP	2 / 13
Petar Cik	1 / 13

== Notable people ==
- Mihajlo Lukić
