= Utiskani =

- Village
- Location within Croatia
- Coordinates: 45.8012553°N 16.7934901°E
- Country: Croatia
- County: Bjelovar-Bilogora County
- Municipality: Ivanska

Area
  - Total: 1.1 sq mi (2.8 km^{2})

Population (2021)
  - Total: 143
  - Density: 130/sq mi (51/km^{2})
- Time zone: UTC+1 (CET)
  - Summer (DST): UTC+2 (CEST)

Utiskani is a village in Croatia.

== Demographics ==
According to the 2021 census, its population was 143.
