= Blahnik =

Blahnik is a surname. Notable people with the name include:

- Jacob J. Blahnik (1881 – c. 1954), American farmer
- Jay Blahnik, American fitness trainer
- Manolo Blahnik (born 1942), Spanish fashion designer

== See also ==
- Blatnik, a similarly spelled surname
