= Veliko Trojstvo =

- Municipality
- Interactive map of Veliko Trojstvo
- Location within Croatia
- Coordinates: 45°56′N 16°56′E
- Country: Croatia
- County: Bjelovar-Bilogora County

Government
  - Mayor: Marko Kutanjac (HSLS)

Area
  - Total: 4.6 sq mi (11.9 km^{2})

Population (2021)
  - Total: 1,075
  - Density: 234/sq mi (90.3/km^{2})
- Time zone: UTC+1 (CET)
  - Summer (DST): UTC+2 (CEST)

Veliko Trojstvo is a settlement and a municipality in Bjelovar-Bilogora County, Croatia.

== Demographics ==
According to the 2021 census, the population of the municipality was 2,379 with 1,075 living in the town proper. In 2011, there were a total of 2,741 inhabitants, in the following settlements:

- Ćurlovac, population 261
- Dominkovica, population 50
- Grginac, population 231
- Kegljevac, population 63
- Maglenča, population 316
- Malo Trojstvo, population 158
- Martinac, population 125
- Paulovac, population 99
- Veliko Trojstvo, population 1,197
- Višnjevac, population 116
- Vrbica, population 125

In the 2001 census, 97% were Croats.

Veliko Trojstvo: Population trends 1857–2021
v

population	1951	2191	2255	2600	3062	3275	3321	3761	4002	4249	4612	4152	3664	3286	3092	2741	2379
	1857	1869	1880	1890	1900	1910	1921	1931	1948	1953	1961	1971	1981	1991	2001	2011	2021

Sources: Croatian Bureau of Statistics publications
