= Stari Skucani =

- Village
- Location within Croatia
- Coordinates: 45.9575847°N 16.8173424°E
- Country: Croatia
- County: Bjelovar-Bilogora County
- Municipality: Kapela

Area
  - Total: 0.66 sq mi (1.7 km^{2})

Population (2021)
  - Total: 120
  - Density: 180/sq mi (71/km^{2})
- Time zone: UTC+1 (CET)
  - Summer (DST): UTC+2 (CEST)

Stari Skucani is a village in Croatia.

== Demographics ==
According to the 2021 census, its population was 120.
