= Rastovac, Ivanska =

Rastovac
- Village
- Location within Croatia
- Coordinates: 45.7975784°N 16.7705368°E
- Country: Croatia
- County: Bjelovar-Bilogora County
- Municipality: Ivanska

Area
  - Total: 0.77 sq mi (2.0 km^{2})

Population (2021)
  - Total: 30
  - Density: 39/sq mi (15/km^{2})
- Time zone: UTC+1 (CET)
  - Summer (DST): UTC+2 (CEST)

Rastovac is a village in Croatia.

== Demographics ==
According to the 2021 census, its population was 30.
