= Samarica =

- Village
- Location within Croatia
- Coordinates: 45.6818033°N 16.7111546°E
- Country: Croatia
- County: Bjelovar-Bilogora County
- Municipality: Ivanska

Area
  - Total: 15.1 sq mi (39.0 km^{2})

Population (2021)
  - Total: 121
  - Density: 8.04/sq mi (3.10/km^{2})
- Time zone: UTC+1 (CET)
  - Summer (DST): UTC+2 (CEST)

Samarica is a village in Croatia.

== Demographics ==
According to the 2021 census, its population was 121.
