= Vagovina =

- Village
- Location within Croatia
- Country: Croatia
- County: Bjelovar-Bilogora County
- Municipality: Čazma

Area
  - Total: 3.1 sq mi (8.0 km^{2})

Population (2021)
  - Total: 333
  - Density: 110/sq mi (42/km^{2})
- Time zone: UTC+1 (CET)
  - Summer (DST): UTC+2 (CEST)

Vagovina is a village in Croatia. It is connected by the D43 highway.

== Demographics ==
According to the 2021 census, its population was 333.
