= Tvrda Reka =

- Village
- Location within Croatia
- Coordinates: 46.002885°N 16.7780492°E
- Country: Croatia
- County: Bjelovar-Bilogora County
- Municipality: Kapela

Area
  - Total: 2.6 sq mi (6.7 km^{2})

Population (2021)
  - Total: 23
  - Density: 8.9/sq mi (3.4/km^{2})
- Time zone: UTC+1 (CET)
  - Summer (DST): UTC+2 (CEST)

Tvrda Reka is a village in Croatia.

== Demographics ==
According to the 2021 census, its population was 23.
