= Kapela, Bjelovar-Bilogora County =

Kapela
- Municipality
- Coat of arms
- Interactive map of Kapela
- Location within Croatia
- Country: Croatia
- County: Bjelovar-Bilogora County

Government
  - Mayor: Danijel Kovačec (Independent)

Area
  - Municipality: 40.3 sq mi (104.3 km^{2})
  - Urban: 3.6 sq mi (9.3 km^{2})

Population (2021)
  - Municipality: 2,367
  - Density: 58.78/sq mi (22.69/km^{2})
  - Urban: 358
  - Urban density: 100/sq mi (38/km^{2})
- Time zone: UTC+1 (CET)
  - Summer (DST): UTC+2 (CEST)
- Website: opcina-kapela.hr

Kapela (Hungarian: Kápolna) is a settlement and a municipality in Bjelovar-Bilogora County, Croatia.

== Demographics ==
According to the 2021 census, the population of the municipality was 2,367 with 358 living in the town proper. There were 3,516 inhabitants in 2001, of which 95% are Croats.

The municipality consists of the following settlements:

- Babotok, population 78
- Botinac, population 88
- Donji Mosti, population 168
- Gornje Zdelice, population 95
- Gornji Mosti, population 51
- Jabučeta, population 40
- Kapela, population 358
- Kobasičari, population 170
- Lalići, population 19
- Lipovo Brdo, population 82
- Nova Diklenica, population 100
- Novi Skucani, population 143
- Pavlin Kloštar, population 116
- Poljančani, population 46
- Prnjavor, population 22
- Reškovci, population 31
- Sredice Gornje, population 113
- Srednja Diklenica, population 49
- Srednji Mosti, population 70
- Stanići, population 95
- Stara Diklenica, population 50
- Starčevljani, population 125
- Stari Skucani, population 120
- Šiptari, population 69
- Tvrda Reka, population 23
- Visovi, population 46
Kapela: Population trends 1857–2021
v

population	3443	3844	4193	5274	5961	6199	6020	6466	6179	6324	6201	5391	4620	3897	3516	2984	2367
	1857	1869	1880	1890	1900	1910	1921	1931	1948	1953	1961	1971	1981	1991	2001	2011	2021

Sources: Croatian Bureau of Statistics publications
