= Kupinovac =

- Village
- Location within Croatia
- Coordinates: 45°56′50″N 16°53′26″E
- Country: Croatia
- County: Bjelovar-Bilogora County
- Municipality: Bjelovar

Area
  - Total: 1.1 sq mi (2.8 km^{2})
- Elevation: 640 ft (195 m)

Population (2021)
  - Total: 117
  - Density: 110/sq mi (42/km^{2})
- Time zone: UTC+1 (CET)
  - Summer (DST): UTC+2 (CEST)
- Postal code: 43000 Bjelovar
- Area code: 043
- Vehicle registration: BJ

Kupinovac is a village in Croatia. It is connected by the D43 highway.

== Demographics ==
According to the 2021 census, its population was 117. It was 144 in 2011.
