= Stanić =

Stanić is a Slavic surname.

- Jozo Stanić (born 1999), Croatian-German footballer
- Krešimir Stanić (born 1985), Swiss footballer of Croatian background
- Mario Stanić (born 1972), Croatian footballer
- Tomislav Stanić (born 1981), Bosnian-Herzegovinian footballer

== See also ==
- Stanich
- Stanići (disambiguation)
