= Donji Mosti =

- Village
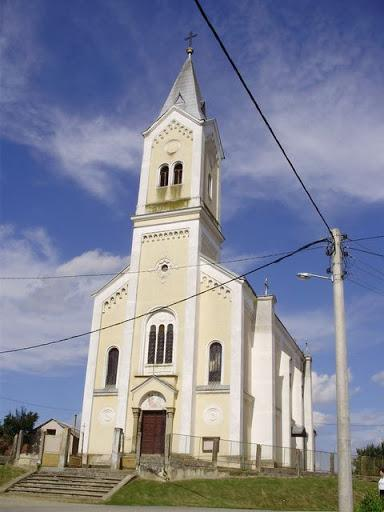
- Church in Donji Mosti, Croatia

- Location within Croatia
- Country: Croatia
- County: Bjelovar-Bilogora County
- Municipality: Kapela

Area
  - Total: 2.7 sq mi (7.0 km^{2})

Population (2021)
  - Total: 168
  - Density: 62/sq mi (24/km^{2})
- Time zone: UTC+1 (CET)
  - Summer (DST): UTC+2 (CEST)

Donji Mosti is a village in Croatia. It is connected by the D2 highway.

== Demographics ==
According to the 2021 census, its population was 168.
