= Pavlin Kloštar =

- Village
- Location within Croatia
- Coordinates: 46.0032494°N 16.8095609°E
- Country: Croatia
- County: Bjelovar-Bilogora County
- Municipality: Kapela

Area
  - Total: 1.9 sq mi (4.9 km^{2})

Population (2021)
  - Total: 116
  - Density: 61/sq mi (24/km^{2})
- Time zone: UTC+1 (CET)
  - Summer (DST): UTC+2 (CEST)

Pavlin Kloštar is a village in Croatia.

== Demographics ==
According to the 2021 census, its population was 116.
