= Stanich =

Stanich is a surname of Serbian, Croatian or Slovenian origin. It is derived from Stanislav. The native form is Stanić. Notable people with the name include:

- Christopher Vincent Stanich (1902–1987), New Zealand master mariner, harbourmaster and waterfront controller
- George Stanich (born 1928), American high jumper and basketball player
- John Stanich (1925–2020), American basketball player
