= Prnjavor, Kapela =

Prnjavor
- Village
- Location within Croatia
- Coordinates: 45.9872139°N 16.7927463°E
- Country: Croatia
- County: Bjelovar-Bilogora County
- Municipality: Kapela

Area
  - Total: 0.50 sq mi (1.3 km^{2})

Population (2021)
  - Total: 22
  - Density: 44/sq mi (17/km^{2})
- Time zone: UTC+1 (CET)
  - Summer (DST): UTC+2 (CEST)

Prnjavor is a village in Croatia.

== Demographics ==
According to the 2021 census, its population was 22.
