= Graberje Ivanićko =

- Village
- Location within Croatia
- Coordinates: 45°43′N 16°29′E
- Country: Croatia
- County: Zagreb County
- Municipality: Ivanić-Grad

Area
  - Total: 8.0 km^{2} (3.1 sq mi)

Population (2021)
  - Total: 548
  - Density: 69/km^{2} (180/sq mi)
- Time zone: UTC+1 (CET)
  - Summer (DST): UTC+2 (CEST)

Graberje Ivanićko is a village in Croatia. It is connected by the D43 highway.
