= Gornja Šušnjara =

- Village
- Location within Croatia
- Coordinates: 45.7753008°N 16.7553433°E
- Country: Croatia
- County: Bjelovar-Bilogora County
- Municipality: Štefanje

Area
  - Total: 0.50 sq mi (1.3 km^{2})

Population (2021)
  - Total: 24
  - Density: 48/sq mi (18/km^{2})
- Time zone: UTC+1 (CET)
  - Summer (DST): UTC+2 (CEST)

Gornja Šušnjara is a village in Croatia.

== Demographics ==
According to the 2021 census, its population was 24.
