= Gornja Petrička =

- Village
- Location within Croatia
- Coordinates: 45.7377434°N 16.7542908°E
- Country: Croatia
- County: Bjelovar-Bilogora County
- Municipality: Ivanska

Area
  - Total: 3.4 sq mi (8.8 km^{2})

Population (2021)
  - Total: 88
  - Density: 26/sq mi (10/km^{2})
- Time zone: UTC+1 (CET)
  - Summer (DST): UTC+2 (CEST)

Gornja Petrička is a village in Croatia.

== Demographics ==
According to the 2021 census, its population was 88.
