= Daskatica =

- Village
- Location within Croatia
- Country: Croatia
- County: Bjelovar-Bilogora County
- Municipality: Štefanje

Area
  - Total: 1.7 sq mi (4.3 km^{2})

Population (2021)
  - Total: 88
  - Density: 53/sq mi (20/km^{2})
- Time zone: UTC+1 (CET)
  - Summer (DST): UTC+2 (CEST)

Daskatica is a village in Croatia. It is connected by the D43 highway.

== Demographics ==
According to the 2021 census, its population was 88. It was 122 in 2011.
