= Caginec =

Metropola Caginec
- Republika
- Location within Croatia
- Coordinates: 45.712917°N 16.448143°E
- Country: Croatia
- County: Zagreb County
- Town: Ivanić-Grad

Area
  - Total: 3.4 km^{2} (1.3 sq mi)

Population (2021)
  - Total: 512
  - Density: 150/km^{2} (390/sq mi)
- Time zone: UTC+1 (CET)
  - Summer (DST): UTC+2 (CEST)

Caginec is a village in Croatia. It is connected by the D43 highway.
