= Starine, Croatia =

Starine
- Village
- Location within Croatia
- Coordinates: 45.8079276°N 16.7416983°E
- Country: Croatia
- County: Bjelovar-Bilogora County
- Municipality: Štefanje

Area
  - Total: 2.5 sq mi (6.5 km^{2})

Population (2021)
  - Total: 54
  - Density: 22/sq mi (8.3/km^{2})
- Time zone: UTC+1 (CET)
  - Summer (DST): UTC+2 (CEST)

Starine is a village in Croatia.

== Demographics ==
According to the 2021 census, its population was 54.
