= Laminac =

- Village
- Location within Croatia
- Coordinates: 45.7953756°N 16.7320478°E
- Country: Croatia
- County: Bjelovar-Bilogora County
- Municipality: Štefanje

Area
  - Total: 3.2 sq mi (8.2 km^{2})

Population (2021)
  - Total: 291
  - Density: 92/sq mi (35/km^{2})
- Time zone: UTC+1 (CET)
  - Summer (DST): UTC+2 (CEST)

Laminac is a village in Croatia.

== Demographics ==
According to the 2021 census, its population was 291.
