= Kobasičari =

- Village
- Location within Croatia
- Coordinates: 45.9646794°N 16.795638°E
- Country: Croatia
- County: Bjelovar-Bilogora County
- Municipality: Kapela

Area
  - Total: 1.3 sq mi (3.4 km^{2})

Population (2021)
  - Total: 170
  - Density: 130/sq mi (50/km^{2})
- Time zone: UTC+1 (CET)
  - Summer (DST): UTC+2 (CEST)

Kobasičari is a village in Croatia.

== Demographics ==
According to the 2021 census, its population was 170.
