= Bosiljevo, Bjelovar-Bilogora County =

Bosiljevo
- Village
- Location within Croatia
- Country: Croatia
- County: Bjelovar-Bilogora County
- Municipality: Čazma

Area
  - Total: 2.3 sq mi (6.0 km^{2})

Population (2021)
  - Total: 214
  - Density: 92/sq mi (36/km^{2})
- Time zone: UTC+1 (CET)
  - Summer (DST): UTC+2 (CEST)

Bosiljevo is a village in Croatia. It is connected by the D43 highway.

== Demographics ==
According to the 2021 census, its population was 214.
