= Jabučeta =

- Village
- Location within Croatia
- Coordinates: 46.0101527°N 16.8809602°E
- Country: Croatia
- County: Bjelovar-Bilogora County
- Municipality: Kapela

Area
  - Total: 0.93 sq mi (2.4 km^{2})

Population (2021)
  - Total: 40
  - Density: 43/sq mi (17/km^{2})
- Time zone: UTC+1 (CET)
  - Summer (DST): UTC+2 (CEST)

Jabučeta is a village in Croatia.

== Demographics ==
According to the 2021 census, its population was 40.
