= Đurđic, Ivanska =

Đurđic
- Village
- Location within Croatia
- Coordinates: 45.7920996°N 16.8090956°E
- Country: Croatia
- County: Bjelovar-Bilogora County
- Municipality: Ivanska

Area
  - Total: 6.1 sq mi (15.9 km^{2})

Population (2021)
  - Total: 156
  - Density: 25.4/sq mi (9.81/km^{2})
- Time zone: UTC+1 (CET)
  - Summer (DST): UTC+2 (CEST)

Đurđic is a village in Croatia.

== Demographics ==
According to the 2021 census, its population was 156.
