= Kolarevo Selo =

- Village
- Location within Croatia
- Coordinates: 45.8176791°N 16.8191276°E
- Country: Croatia
- County: Bjelovar-Bilogora County
- Municipality: Ivanska

Area
  - Total: 2.1 sq mi (5.5 km^{2})

Population (2021)
  - Total: 130
  - Density: 61/sq mi (24/km^{2})
- Time zone: UTC+1 (CET)
  - Summer (DST): UTC+2 (CEST)

Kolarevo Selo is a village in Croatia.

== Demographics ==
According to the 2021 census, its population was 130.
