= Donja Petrička =

- Village
- Location within Croatia
- Coordinates: 45.7278959°N 16.7705741°E
- Country: Croatia
- County: Bjelovar-Bilogora County
- Municipality: Ivanska

Area
  - Total: 3.1 sq mi (7.9 km^{2})

Population (2021)
  - Total: 120
  - Density: 39/sq mi (15/km^{2})
- Time zone: UTC+1 (CET)
  - Summer (DST): UTC+2 (CEST)

Donja Petrička is a village in Croatia.

== Demographics ==
According to the 2021 census, its population was 120.
