= Srednji Mosti =

- Village
- Location within Croatia
- Coordinates: 46.0589342°N 16.8433958°E
- Country: Croatia
- County: Bjelovar-Bilogora County
- Municipality: Kapela

Area
  - Total: 1.1 sq mi (2.8 km^{2})

Population (2021)
  - Total: 70
  - Density: 65/sq mi (25/km^{2})
- Time zone: UTC+1 (CET)
  - Summer (DST): UTC+2 (CEST)

Srednji Mosti is a village in Croatia.

== Demographics ==
According to the 2021 census, its population was 70.
