= Nova Diklenica =

- Village
- Location within Croatia
- Coordinates: 45.9752063°N 16.8683393°E
- Country: Croatia
- County: Bjelovar-Bilogora County
- Municipality: Kapela

Area
  - Total: 0.97 sq mi (2.5 km^{2})

Population (2021)
  - Total: 100
  - Density: 100/sq mi (40/km^{2})
- Time zone: UTC+1 (CET)
  - Summer (DST): UTC+2 (CEST)

Nova Diklenica is a village in Croatia.

== Demographics ==
According to the 2021 census, its population was 100.
