= Remetovac =

Coordinates: 45°59′19″N 16°53′55″E

Remetovac is a mountain pass over the Bilogora located near Ćurlovac, Croatia. It lies at an altitude of 238 metres (781 ft) m.a.s.l.
