= Srednja Diklenica =

- Village
- Location within Croatia
- Coordinates: 45.9656609°N 16.855661°E
- Country: Croatia
- County: Bjelovar-Bilogora County
- Municipality: Kapela

Area
  - Total: 0.85 sq mi (2.2 km^{2})

Population (2021)
  - Total: 49
  - Density: 58/sq mi (22/km^{2})
- Time zone: UTC+1 (CET)
  - Summer (DST): UTC+2 (CEST)

Srednja Diklenica is a village in Croatia.

== Demographics ==
According to the 2021 census, its population was 49.
