= Maglenča =

- Village
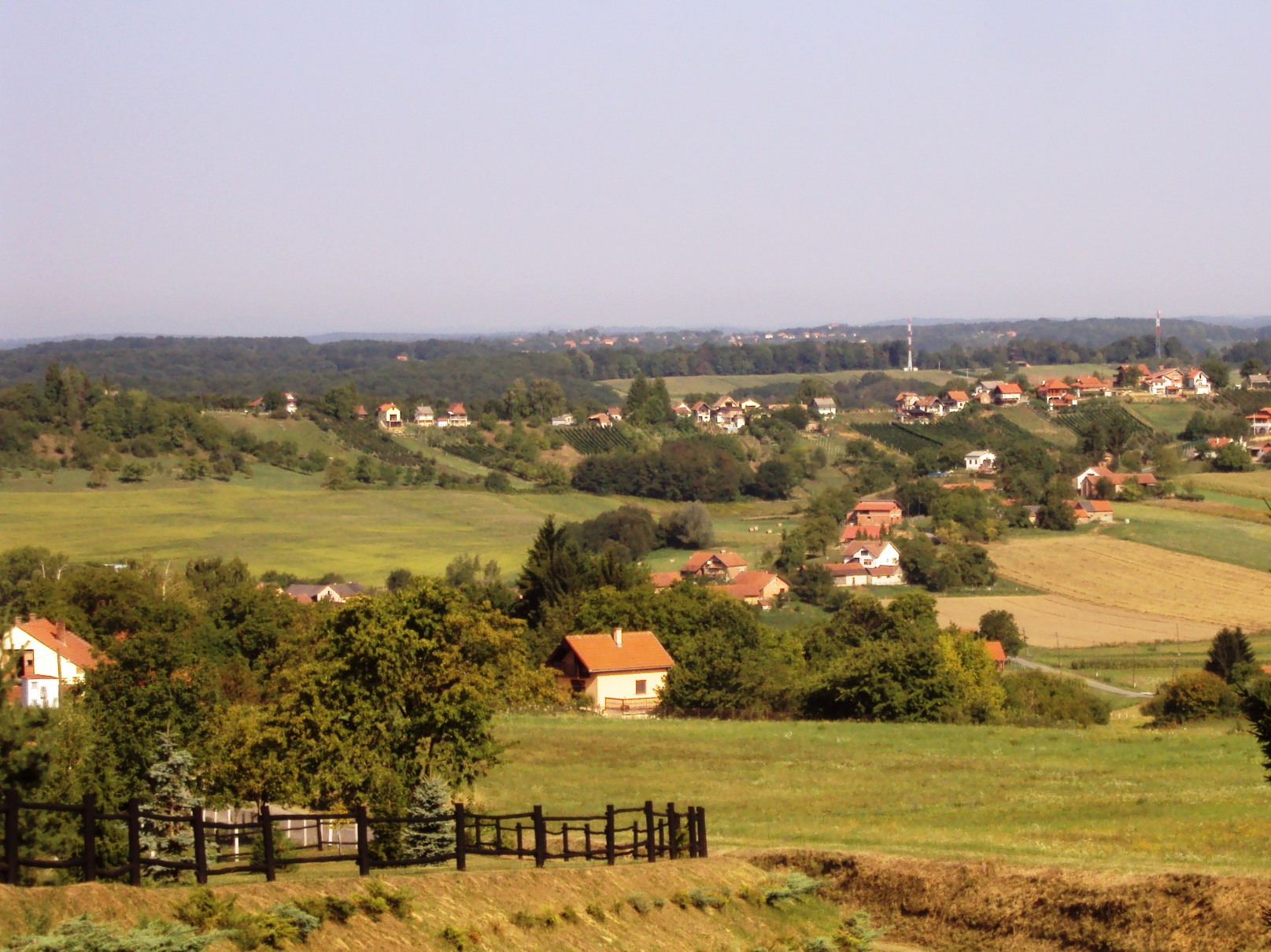

- Location within Croatia
- Coordinates: 45.9049795°N 16.9110501°E
- Country: Croatia
- County: Bjelovar-Bilogora County
- Municipality: Veliko Trojstvo

Area
  - Total: 5.4 sq mi (13.9 km^{2})

Population (2021)
  - Total: 280
  - Density: 52/sq mi (20/km^{2})
- Time zone: UTC+1 (CET)
  - Summer (DST): UTC+2 (CEST)

Maglenča is a village in Croatia.

== Demographics ==
According to the 2021 census, its population was 280.
