= Gornje Zdelice =

- Village
- Location within Croatia
- Coordinates: 46.0245802°N 16.8615874°E
- Country: Croatia
- County: Bjelovar-Bilogora County
- Municipality: Kapela

Area
  - Total: 2.8 sq mi (7.3 km^{2})

Population (2021)
  - Total: 95
  - Density: 34/sq mi (13/km^{2})
- Time zone: UTC+1 (CET)
  - Summer (DST): UTC+2 (CEST)

Gornje Zdelice is a village in Croatia.

== Demographics ==
According to the 2021 census, its population was 95.
