= Malo Trojstvo =

- Village
- Location within Croatia
- Coordinates: 45.9698383°N 16.93268°E
- Country: Croatia
- County: Bjelovar-Bilogora County
- Municipality: Veliko Trojstvo

Area
  - Total: 1.6 sq mi (4.2 km^{2})

Population (2021)
  - Total: 138
  - Density: 85/sq mi (33/km^{2})
- Time zone: UTC+1 (CET)
  - Summer (DST): UTC+2 (CEST)

Malo Trojstvo is a village in Croatia.

== Climate ==
Between 1984 and 2003, the highest temperature recorded at the local weather station was 34.3 °C (93.7 °F), on 3 August 1988. The coldest temperature was −23.4 °C (−10.1 °F), on 13 February 1985.

== Demographics ==
According to the 2021 census, its population was 138.
