= Martinac, Veliko Trojstvo =

Martinac
- Village
- Location within Croatia
- Coordinates: 45.948733°N 16.8966813°E
- Country: Croatia
- County: Bjelovar-Bilogora County
- Municipality: Veliko Trojstvo

Area
  - Total: 2.2 sq mi (5.6 km^{2})

Population (2021)
  - Total: 127
  - Density: 59/sq mi (23/km^{2})
- Time zone: UTC+1 (CET)
  - Summer (DST): UTC+2 (CEST)

Martinac is a village in Croatia.

== Demographics ==
According to the 2021 census, its population was 127.
