= Babinac, Ivanska =

Babinac
- Village
- Location within Croatia
- Coordinates: 45.7548564°N 16.7913788°E
- Country: Croatia
- County: Bjelovar-Bilogora County
- Municipality: Ivanska

Area
  - Total: 1.6 sq mi (4.1 km^{2})

Population (2021)
  - Total: 118
  - Density: 75/sq mi (29/km^{2})
- Time zone: UTC+1 (CET)
  - Summer (DST): UTC+2 (CEST)

Babinac is a village in Croatia.

== Demographics ==
According to the 2021 census, its population was 118.
