= Reškovci =

- Village
- Location within Croatia
- Coordinates: 45.9930035°N 16.8044153°E
- Country: Croatia
- County: Bjelovar-Bilogora County
- Municipality: Kapela

Area
  - Total: 0.46 sq mi (1.2 km^{2})

Population (2021)
  - Total: 31
  - Density: 67/sq mi (26/km^{2})
- Time zone: UTC+1 (CET)
  - Summer (DST): UTC+2 (CEST)

Reškovci is a village in Croatia.

== Demographics ==
Currently, the population of this village is 48.
