= Vrbica, Bjelovar-Bilogora County =

Vrbica
- Village
- Location within Croatia
- Coordinates: 45.9620421°N 16.9550379°E
- Country: Croatia
- County: Bjelovar-Bilogora County
- Municipality: Veliko Trojstvo

Area
  - Total: 5.8 sq mi (15.1 km^{2})

Population (2021)
  - Total: 93
  - Density: 16/sq mi (6.2/km^{2})
- Time zone: UTC+1 (CET)
  - Summer (DST): UTC+2 (CEST)

Vrbica is a village in Croatia.

== Demographics ==
According to the 2021 census, its population was 93.
