= Srijedska =

- Village
- Location within Croatia
- Coordinates: 45.7598694°N 16.8284162°E
- Country: Croatia
- County: Bjelovar-Bilogora County
- Municipality: Ivanska

Area
  - Total: 3.4 sq mi (8.7 km^{2})

Population (2021)
  - Total: 245
  - Density: 73/sq mi (28/km^{2})
- Time zone: UTC+1 (CET)
  - Summer (DST): UTC+2 (CEST)

Srijedska is a village in Croatia.

== Demographics ==
According to the 2021 census, its population was 245.
