= Blatnick =

Blatnick is a surname. Notable people with the surname include:

- Jamie Blatnick (born 1989), American football player
- Jeff Blatnick (1957–2012), American super heavyweight Greco-Roman wrestler and sports commentator
- Alternative spelling of the surname of Johnny Blatnik, (1921–2004), American professional baseball outfielder

== See also ==
- Blatnik
