= Letičani =

- Village
- Location within Croatia
- Country: Croatia
- County: Bjelovar-Bilogora County
- Municipality: Bjelovar

Area
  - Total: 1.4 sq mi (3.7 km^{2})

Population (2021)
  - Total: 325
  - Density: 230/sq mi (88/km^{2})
- Time zone: UTC+1 (CET)
  - Summer (DST): UTC+2 (CEST)

Letičani is a village in Croatia. It is connected by the D43 highway.

== Demographics ==
According to the 2021 census, its population was 325.
