= Ivanska =

- Municipality
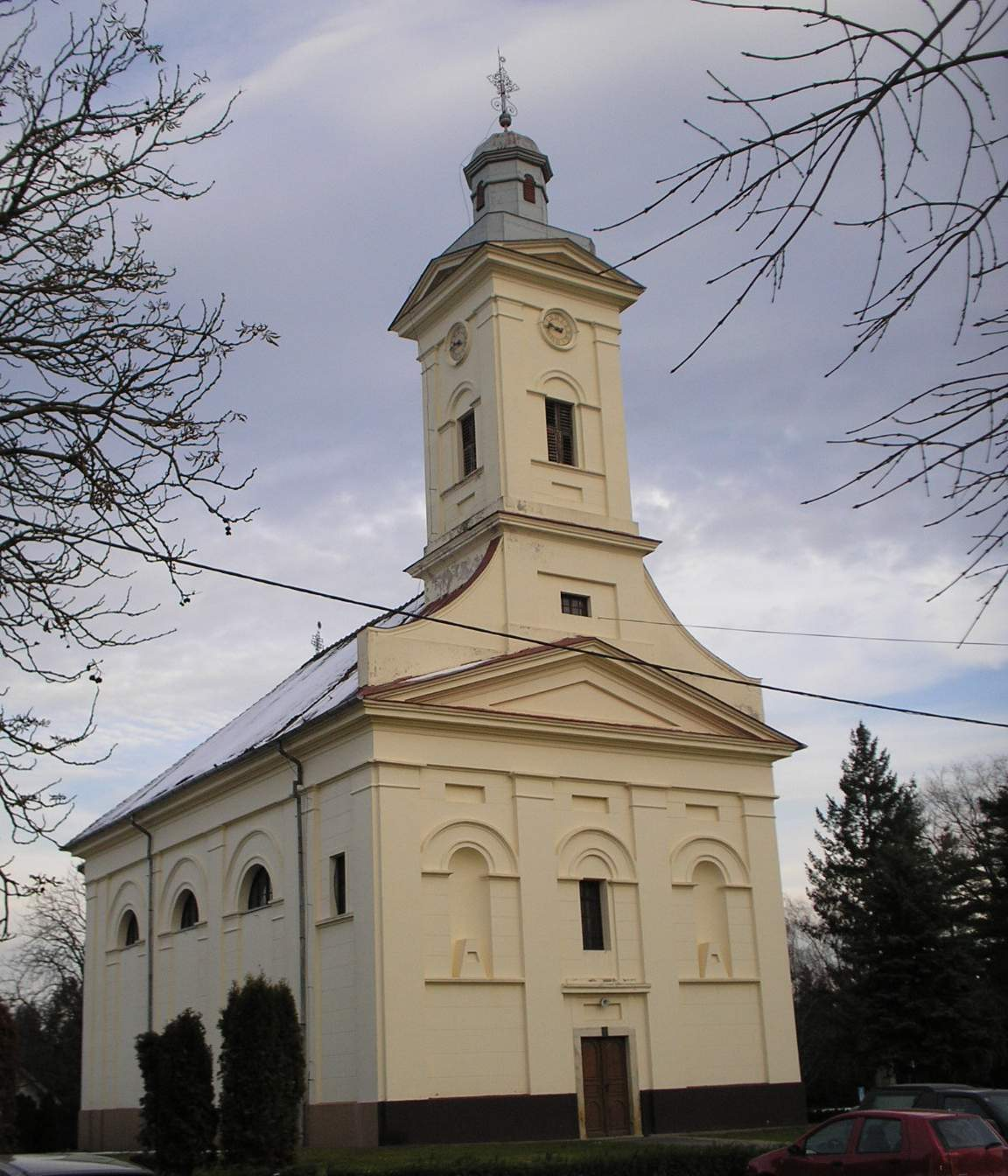
- The church of Saint John the Baptist, Ivanska, Croatia
- Interactive map of Ivanska
- Location within Croatia
- Country: Croatia
- County: Bjelovar-Bilogora County

Government
  - Mayor: Željko Mavrin (HSS)

Area
  - Municipality: 51.0 sq mi (132.1 km^{2})
  - Urban: 5.0 sq mi (13.0 km^{2})

Population (2021)
  - Municipality: 2,256
  - Density: 44.23/sq mi (17.08/km^{2})
  - Urban: 564
  - Urban density: 112/sq mi (43.4/km^{2})
- Time zone: UTC+1 (CET)
  - Summer (DST): UTC+2 (CEST)
- Website: ivanska.hr

Ivanska is a village and a municipality in Bjelovar-Bilogora County, Croatia. There were 2,911 inhabitants in 2011, of which 92% Croats. The village of Ivanska itself had a population of 722.

== History ==
In the late 19th and early 20th century, Ivanska was part of the Bjelovar-Križevci County of the Kingdom of Croatia-Slavonia.

== Demographics ==
In 2021, the municipality had 2,256 residents in the following 13 settlements:

- Babinac, population 118
- Donja Petrička, population 120
- Đurđic, population 156
- Gornja Petrička, population 88
- Ivanska, population 564
- Kolarevo Selo, population 130
- Križic, population 148
- Paljevine, population 199
- Rastovac, population 30
- Samarica, population 121
- Srijedska, population 245
- Stara Plošćica, population 194
- Utiskani, population 143
Ivanska: Population trends 1857–2021
v

| population | 3832 | 3683 | 3755 | 4899 | 5671 | 5960 | 6007 | 6270 | 6505 | 6320 | 6061 | 5258 | 4443 | 3824 | 3510 | 2911 | 2256 |
| | 1857 | 1869 | 1880 | 1890 | 1900 | 1910 | 1921 | 1931 | 1948 | 1953 | 1961 | 1971 | 1981 | 1991 | 2001 | 2011 | 2021 |

Sources: Croatian Bureau of Statistics publications

== Politics ==
=== Minority councils and representatives ===
Directly elected minority councils and representatives are tasked with consulting tasks for the local or regional authorities in which they are advocating for minority rights and interests, integration into public life and participation in the management of local affairs. At the 2023 Croatian national minorities councils and representatives elections Serbs of Croatia fulfilled legal requirements to elect their own 10 members minority councils of the Municipality of Ivanksa with only 6 candidates being elected in the end.
