= Kegljevac =

- Village
- Location within Croatia
- Coordinates: 45.9828902°N 16.9335878°E
- Country: Croatia
- County: Bjelovar-Bilogora County
- Municipality: Veliko Trojstvo

Area
  - Total: 1.1 sq mi (2.9 km^{2})

Population (2021)
  - Total: 46
  - Density: 41/sq mi (16/km^{2})
- Time zone: UTC+1 (CET)
  - Summer (DST): UTC+2 (CEST)

Kegljevac is a village in Croatia.

== Demographics ==
According to the 2021 census, its population was 46.
