= Stanići, Bjelovar-Bilogora County =

Stanići
- Village
- Interactive map of Stanići
- Location within Croatia
- Coordinates: 45.9647955°N 16.8098864°E
- Country: Croatia
- County: Bjelovar-Bilogora County
- Municipality: Kapela

Area
  - Total: 1.0 sq mi (2.7 km^{2})

Population (2021)
  - Total: 95
  - Density: 91/sq mi (35/km^{2})
- Time zone: UTC+1 (CET)
  - Summer (DST): UTC+2 (CEST)

Stanići is a village in Croatia.

== Demographics ==
According to the 2021 census, its population was 95.
