= Narta, Croatia =

Narta
- Village
- Location within Croatia
- Country: Croatia
- County: Bjelovar-Bilogora County
- Municipality: Štefanje

Area
  - Total: 4.1 sq mi (10.5 km^{2})

Population (2021)
  - Total: 573
  - Density: 141/sq mi (54.6/km^{2})
- Time zone: UTC+1 (CET)
  - Summer (DST): UTC+2 (CEST)

Narta (historically known as Nard or Nart) is a village within the Štefanje municipality of Bjelovar-Bilogora County, Croatia. It is connected by the D43 highway. Narta is the largest settlement within the municipality of Štefanje in terms of population.

== Demographics ==
According to the 2021 census, its population was 573. It was 677 in 2011.
