= Stara Plošćica =

- Village
- Location within Croatia
- Coordinates: 45.7545343°N 16.8446622°E
- Country: Croatia
- County: Bjelovar-Bilogora County
- Municipality: Ivanska

Area
  - Total: 4.5 sq mi (11.6 km^{2})

Population (2021)
  - Total: 194
  - Density: 43.3/sq mi (16.7/km^{2})
- Time zone: UTC+1 (CET)
  - Summer (DST): UTC+2 (CEST)

Stara Plošćica is a village in Croatia.

== Demographics ==
According to the 2021 census, its population was 194.
