= Novi Skucani =

- Village
- Location within Croatia
- Country: Croatia
- County: Bjelovar-Bilogora County
- Municipality: Kapela

Area
  - Total: 0.62 sq mi (1.6 km^{2})

Population (2021)
  - Total: 143
  - Density: 230/sq mi (89/km^{2})
- Time zone: UTC+1 (CET)
  - Summer (DST): UTC+2 (CEST)

Novi Skucani is a village in Croatia. It is connected by the D2 highway.

== Demographics ==
According to the 2021 census, its population was 143.
