= Miholjanec =

- Village
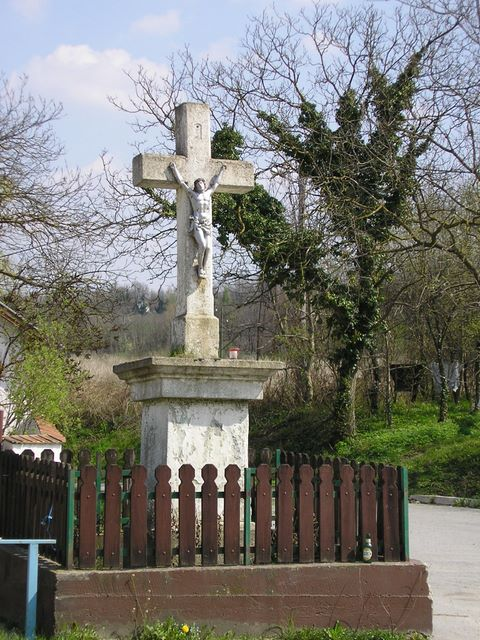
- Roadside crucifix in the center of Miholjanec
- Interactive map of Miholjanec
- Country: Croatia
- Region: Podravina
- County: Koprivnica-Križevci County
- Municipality: Virje

Area
  - Total: 13.2 km^{2} (5.1 sq mi)
  - Land: 13.14 km^{2} (5.07 sq mi)

Population (2021)
  - Total: 244
  - Density: 18.6/km^{2} (48.1/sq mi)
- Time zone: UTC+1 (CET)
  - Summer (DST): UTC+2 (CEST)
- Postal code: 48326

Miholjanec is a village in Croatia and one of the oldest settlements in the country.

== History ==
=== Ancient times ===
Miholjanec has been settled since at least the Iron Age. During the late Iron Age, the so-called bini populi ("two people") lived in the area that would eventually become Miholjanec. Historians are unclear on who exactly the bini populi were; through the years they have been variously identified as Latin Romans, Scythians, Hebrews, Greeks, Alans, Goths, and Germans. These people built a hill fort on a high plateau. The fort covered 6 hectares (15 acres) and was surrounded by a moat.

=== Middle Ages ===
In the 10th century, a vineyard was planted on a hill near Miholjanec. The vineyard's name is translated as is "the seat of the master of the mountain". This vineyard still stands today.

In 1160, a plot of land was donated to the Knights Templar, who built a monastery in nearby Zdelia. This was the earliest historical mention of the Templars in Croatia and Hungary. There is also a river near Zdelia that has been known by many names.

In 1270, an unknown ancient castle was discovered on the land of Mikula. A parish church was built on the spot of the ancient castle in 1334 and called the church of Saint Michael. Miholjanec is named after the church.

After the dissolving of the Templars, the Order of Saint John of Jerusalem came to Miholjanec, who in 1358 swapped their plot in Miholjanec for another plot in another village. The parish church in that village, the Assumption of Mary, was given jus patronatus over a church of unknown location halfway between the village and Milengrad, where prisoners of war, war wounded, and war loot were sent.

=== Early modern period ===
In 1673, when Miholjanec was part of the Military Frontier, there was a funfair and public bath house for border guard officers and other gentlemen.

In 1676, a letter mentioned a contract between parishioners in Miholjanec and their parish priest. This letter confirmed all liberties afforded to the parishioners, but whoever disturbed church on Sunday would be required to pay 10 denarius (10 percent of a ducat) as punishment. In the same year 1676, a new wooden church was built in Miholjanec.

In 1736, a great flood of the river Drava raised the waters for several months between Novigrad Podravski, Hlebine, Molve, and Virje. The people of these towns fled to the hill villages of Plavšinac and Miholjanec. This influx led to the rediscovery of Miholjanec's ancient vineyards. Soon after, 300 new vineyards were planted between Plavšinac and Miholjanec in Novigrad Podravski, which by that time had become the seat of a regiment.

In 1779, a new church was built, which stands to this day. During construction, a human skeleton was discovered under the stairs of the old church. In addition, a cenotaph was discovered in the village, which in the 1960s was dated to the late Iron Age, possibly 1209.

In 1780, it was agreed between the Franciscan monastery in Koprivnica and the General of the Military Frontier that begging in Miholjanec was the sole right of the Franciscans.

=== Modern era ===
In 1836, Maria Theresa made an unsuccessful attempt to restore the ruins of the Roman aqueduct in Miholjanec, which comes down the street from St. Michael. Most of it is in ruins, but those of St. John, which is 12 Roman miles long, was more than only successful.

The regulation of the Drava river between 1830 and 1844 significantly reduced the frequency of flooding. Settlements in the hills around Miholjanec increased in population, which brought logging and a reduced acreage of forests.

=== Twentieth century ===
In 1923, Miholjanec celebrated its 750th anniversary, with guests dancing on a natural dance floor with natural acoustics, similar to an amphitheatre.

In 1937, Le Monde Slave (The Slavic World), published in Paris by Ernest Denis and Robert de Caix mentioned that the folks songs from Miholjanec had been examined in 1933, and fifty of those songs had been reproduced and recorded.
