= Blatnica, Bjelovar-Bilogora County =

Blatnica
- Village
- Location within Croatia
- Coordinates: 45°50′N 16°45′E
- Country: Croatia
- County: Bjelovar-Bilogora County
- Municipality: Štefanje

Area
  - Total: 5.3 sq mi (13.7 km^{2})

Population (2021)
  - Total: 89
  - Density: 17/sq mi (6.5/km^{2})
- Time zone: UTC+1 (CET)
  - Summer (DST): UTC+2 (CEST)

Blatnica is a village in central Croatia, just southwest of Bjelovar.

== Demographics ==
According to the 2021 census, its population was 89. The population was 130 in 2011.

The nearby Blatnica fish ponds, created by draining the floodplains of the Česma river, are a major bird habitat with more than 100 recorded bird species, and a part of the Natura 2000 network.
