= Babotok =

- Village
- Location within Croatia
- Country: Croatia
- County: Bjelovar-Bilogora County
- Municipality: Kapela

Area
  - Total: 1.5 sq mi (3.8 km^{2})

Population (2021)
  - Total: 78
  - Density: 53/sq mi (21/km^{2})
- Time zone: UTC+1 (CET)
  - Summer (DST): UTC+2 (CEST)

Babotok is a village in Croatia, located in the Kapela municipality in Bjelovar-Bilogora County.

== Demographics ==
According to the 2021 census, its population was 78.
