= Nikola Šop =

Bosnian Croat poet (1904–1982)

Nikola Šop (19 August 1904 – 2 January 1982) was a Bosnian Croat poet.

== Biography ==
Šop was born on 19 August 1904 in Jajce to a family of Bosnian Croats. He graduated in 1931 from the Faculty of Philosophy, University of Belgrade in comparative literature.

According to Saša Vereš, in a preface to Selected Works, in the Five centuries of Croatian literature, Šop's work deals with a solitude, in which he placed his "imagined poetic world, more so than religiosity itself", which "radiates from most of his poems as a natural state of mind and consciousness". Šop is a "modern Christian who overcomes dogmas with humanity, naivety and kindness, like fra. Marko Krneta from Andrić's short story, author addresses his verses directly to Jesus without piety, with warm human immediacy, as intimate messages to a friend who is equal to, and who shares good and evil with him". Šop's Christ is a "complete man", who renounces "divine power in order to soften, ennoble human hearts with his own humility and goodness".

Šop's poetry collections notably include Mysterious Prela (1943), whose "inner sophistication of religious feeling, ascended to the cosmic heights" which will inspire his follow-up collections, Houses in Space (1957) and Astrals (1961). In Chop's poetry, "religiosity reached a cosmic dimension" and "revealed its aesthetic value".

Šop died on 2 January 1982 in Zagreb.

== Literary works ==
Poetry collections also include:

- “Pjesme siromašnog sina” (1926.)
- “Isus i moja sjena” (1934.)
- “Od ranih do kasnih pijetlova” (1939.)
- “Za kasnim stolom” (1943.)
- “Tajanstvena prela” (1943.)
- “Kućice u svemiru” (1957.)
- “Astralije” (1961.)
