= Pavao Tijan =

Croatian encyclopaedist (1908–1997)

Pavao Tijan (15 June 1908 – 2 July 1997) was a Croatian encyclopaedist who spent the latter half of his life in Spain.

Tijan was born in Senj in 1908. He attended the University of Zagreb where he finished a degree in Croatian studies and Slavic studies in 1930. He was subsequently a gymnasium professor. He edited Hrvatski jezik was also a member of the Croatian Encyclopedia project. He was a member of the Croatian Publishing and Bibliographic Institute and edited its publication Književni tjednik. With the fall of the Independent State of Croatia in 1945 he fled from the oncoming Yugoslav Partisan army for fear of reprisal. He and members of his family travelled through Austria and settled in Rome where Tijan remained until 1947. From there he travelled to Madrid, which remained his home for the rest of his life.

In 1993, Tijan returned to Zagreb and Senj for his first visit to Croatia in 48 years. Tijan was made an honorary citizen of Senj. He died in Madrid in 1997. In 2007, the Croatian Government had his written works brought to Zagreb from Madrid.

== See also ==
- Croatian Publishing and Bibliographic Institute
