= Štefanje =

- Municipality
- Interactive map of Štefanje
- Location within Croatia
- Country: Croatia
- County: Bjelovar-Bilogora County

Government
  - Mayor: Silvestar Štefović (Independent)

Area
  - Municipality: 3.1 sq mi (8.0 km^{2})

Population (2021)
  - Municipality: 1,688
  - Density: 550/sq mi (210/km^{2})
  - Urban: 336
- Time zone: UTC+1 (CET)
  - Summer (DST): UTC+2 (CEST)

Štefanje is a settlement and a municipality in Bjelovar-Bilogora County, Croatia.

== Demographics ==
According to the 2021 census, the population of the municipality was 1,688 with 300 living in the town proper. In 2011, there were 2,030 inhabitants. In the 2011 census, 92% of the population were Croats.

The municipality consists of the following settlements:

- Blatnica, population 89
- Daskatica, population 88
- Donja Šušnjara, population 115
- Gornja Šušnjara, population 24
- Laminac, population 291
- Narta, population 573
- Starine, population 54
- Staro Štefanje, population 154
- Štefanje, population 300
Štefanje: Population trends 1857–2021
v

population	2732	2763	2996	3646	4097	4431	4333	4474	4511	4554	4125	3484	2905	2577	2347	2030	1688
	1857	1869	1880	1890	1900	1910	1921	1931	1948	1953	1961	1971	1981	1991	2001	2011	2021

Sources: Croatian Bureau of Statistics publications

== Politics ==
=== Minority councils and representatives ===
Directly elected minority councils and representatives are tasked with consulting tasks for the local or regional authorities in which they are advocating for minority rights and interests, integration into public life and participation in the management of local affairs. At the 2023 Croatian national minorities councils and representatives elections Serbs of Croatia fulfilled legal requirements to elect 10 members minority council of the Municipality of Štefanje but ending up electing only 7 members.
