= Predavac =

- Village
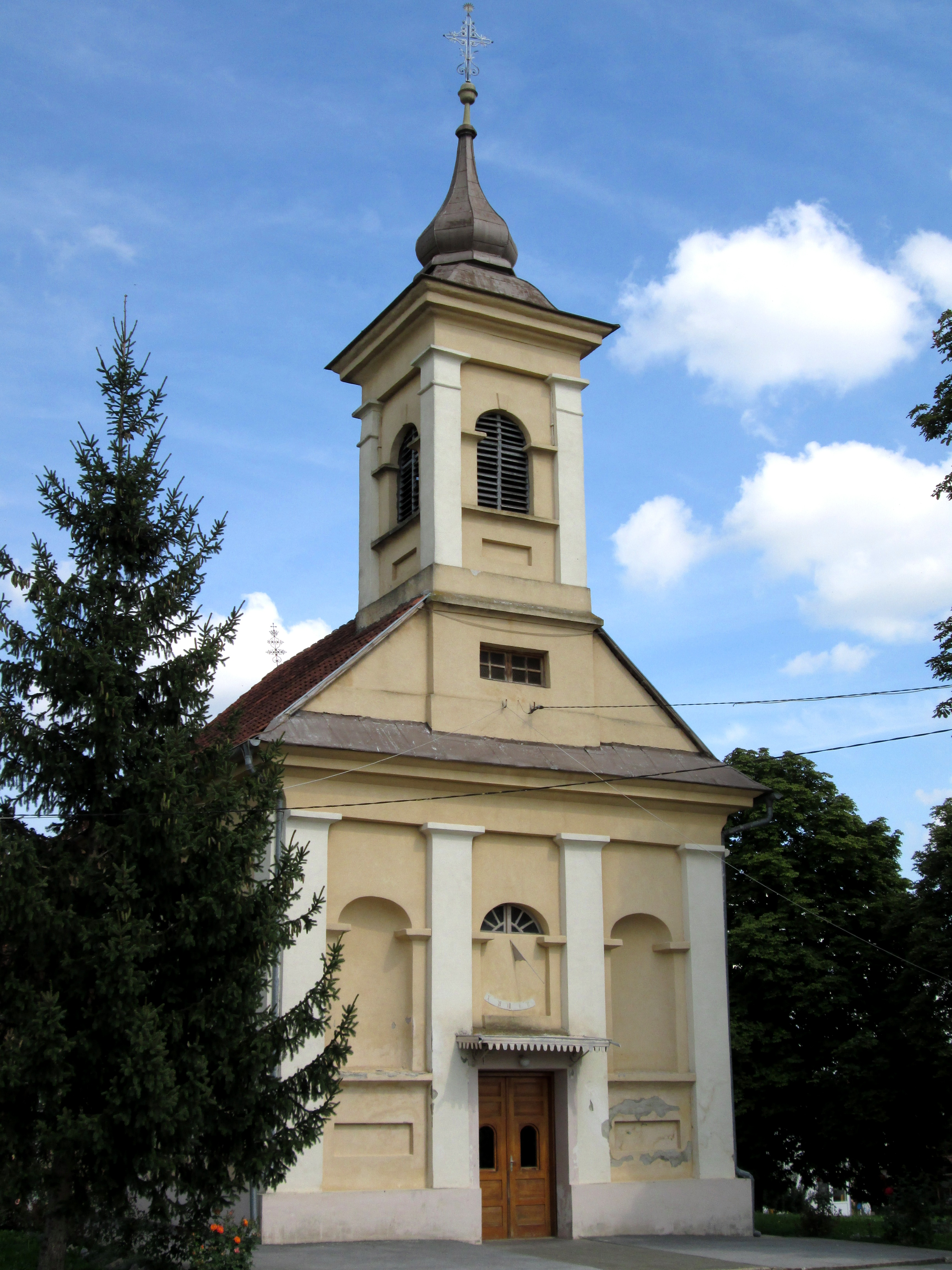
- Church of Predavac

- Location within Croatia
- Coordinates: 45.92637°N 16.787305°E
- Country: Croatia
- County: Bjelovar-Bilogora County
- Municipality: Rovišće

Area
  - Total: 5.5 sq mi (14.2 km^{2})

Population (2021)
  - Total: 1,144
  - Density: 209/sq mi (80.6/km^{2})
- Time zone: UTC+1 (CET)
  - Summer (DST): UTC+2 (CEST)

Predavac is a village in Croatia. It is connected by the D28 highway.

== Demographics ==
According to the 2021 census, its population was 1,144. There were 1,254 inhabitants in 2011.
