= Hampovica =

Coordinates: 46°01′N 16°57′E

- Village
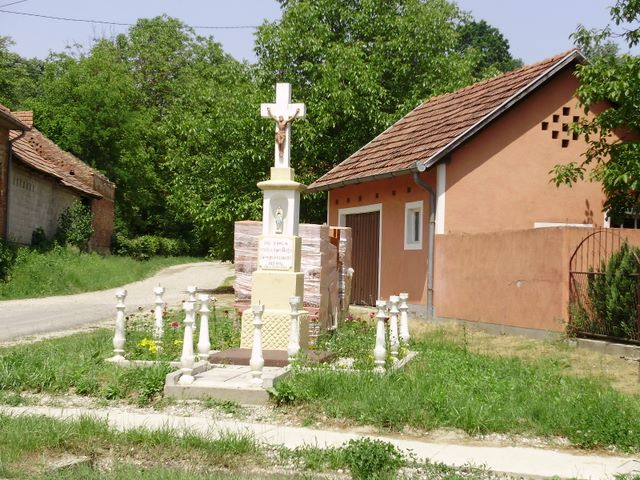
- Crucifix in Hampovica
- Interactive map of Hampovica
- Country: Croatia
- County: Koprivnica-Križevci County

Area
  - Total: 11.2 km^{2} (4.3 sq mi)

Population (2021)
  - Total: 215
  - Density: 19.2/km^{2} (49.7/sq mi)
- Time zone: UTC+1 (CET)
  - Summer (DST): UTC+2 (CEST)

Hampovica is a village in Croatia. It is connected by the D43 highway.
