= Donje Zdjelice =

Coordinates: 46°01′30″N 16°54′45″E

- Village
- Interactive map of Donje Zdjelice
- Country: Croatia
- County: Koprivnica-Križevci County

Area
  - Total: 3.3 km^{2} (1.3 sq mi)

Population (2021)
  - Total: 63
  - Density: 19/km^{2} (49/sq mi)
- Time zone: UTC+1 (CET)
  - Summer (DST): UTC+2 (CEST)

Donje Zdjelice is a village in Croatia.
