= Šemovci =

Coordinates: 46°01′N 17°00′E

- Village
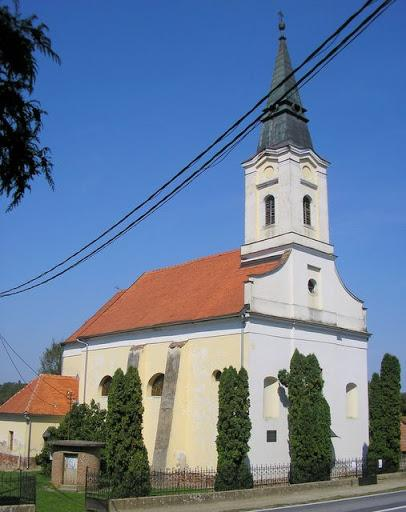
- Interactive map of Šemovci
- Country: Croatia
- County: Koprivnica-Križevci County

Area
  - Total: 3.3 sq mi (8.5 km^{2})

Population (2021)
  - Total: 402
  - Density: 120/sq mi (47/km^{2})
- Time zone: UTC+1 (CET)
  - Summer (DST): UTC+2 (CEST)

Šemovci is a village in Croatia. It is connected by the D43 highway.
