= Sišćani =

Siščani
- Village
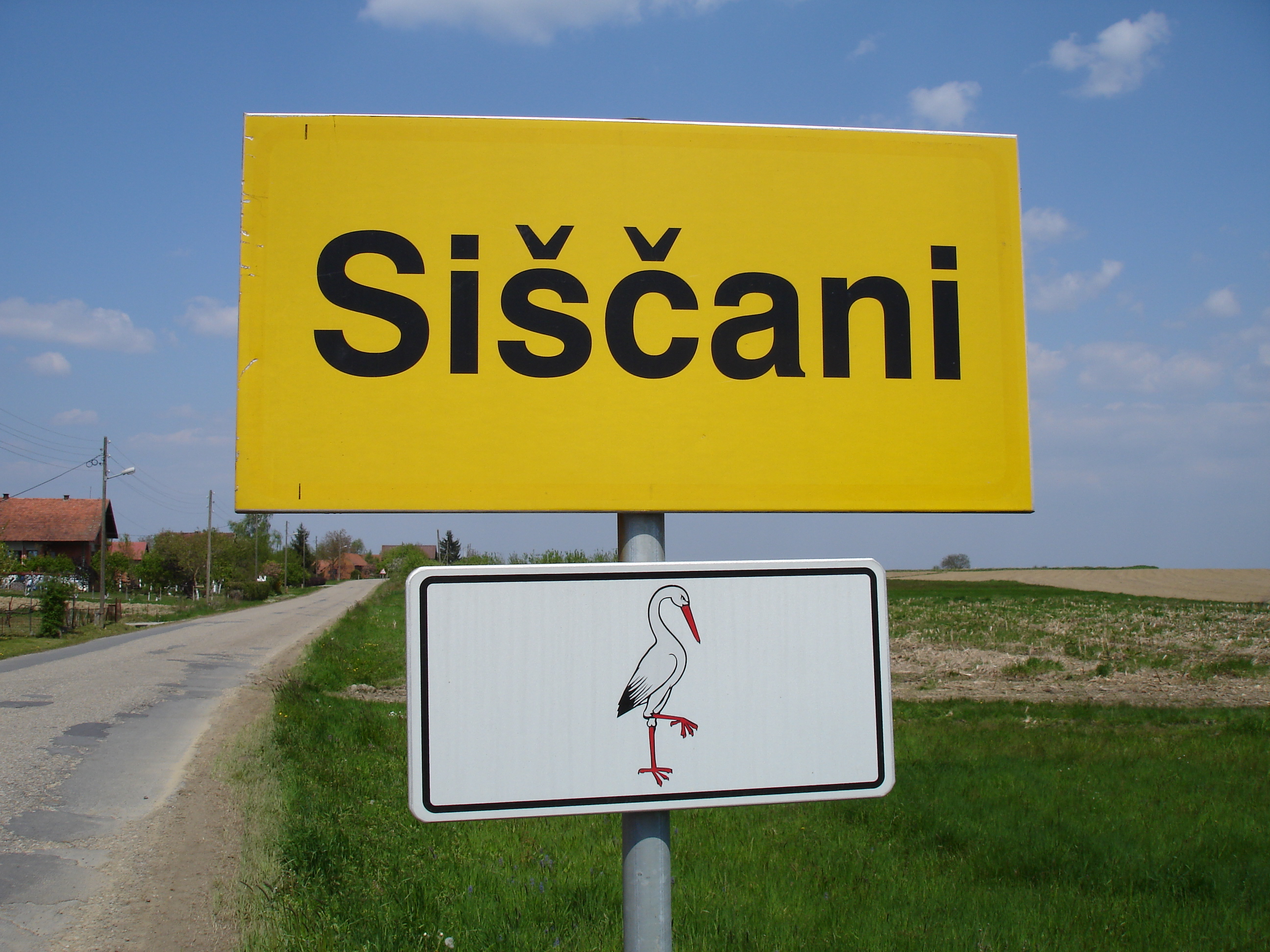

- Location within Croatia
- Country: Croatia
- County: Bjelovar-Bilogora County
- Municipality: Čazma

Area
  - Total: 6.0 sq mi (15.5 km^{2})

Population (2021)
  - Total: 276
  - Density: 46.1/sq mi (17.8/km^{2})
- Time zone: UTC+1 (CET)
  - Summer (DST): UTC+2 (CEST)

Sišćani is a village in Croatia, located in the municipality of Čazma, Bjelovar-Bilogora.

Sišćani is also known as the Storks village due to the existence of several nests of White stork.

== Demographics ==
According to the 2021 census, its population was 276.
