= Gradišće =

Gradišće may refer to:

- Gradišće, Austria, Croatian name for Burgenland, a region in Austria
- Gradišće, Bosnia and Herzegovina, a village near Zenica
- Gradišće, Istria County, a village near Žminj, Croatia
- Gradišće, Karlovac County, a village near Generalski Stol, Croatia
