= Gradisce =

Gradisce may refer to:

- Gradišče, a Slovene toponym
- Gradišće, a Croatian toponym
