= List of prisons in Croatia =

This is a list of correctional facilities in Croatia. There are four types of correctional facilities: penitentiaries, prisons, reformatories and diagnostics centres.

== Penitentiaries ==
Name	Location	Opened	Security classification	Sexes
Glina Penitentiary	Glina	1902	High/Medium	Men
Lepoglava Penitentiary	Lepoglava	1854	High/Medium/Minimum	Men
Lipovica-Popovača Penitentiary	Popovača	1956	Medium/Minimum	Men
Požega Penitentiary	Požega	1941	High/Medium/Minimum	Women/Men
Turopolje Penitentiary	Velika Gorica	1959	Medium	Men
Valtura Penitentiary	Pula	1956	Minimum	Men
Zagreb Prison Hospital	Zagreb	1946	High	Men

== Prisons ==
Name	Location	Opened
Bjelovar Prison	Bjelovar	1828
Dubrovnik Prison	Dubrovnik	1983
Gospić Prison	Gospić	1877
Karlovac Prison	Karlovac	1840
Osijek Prison	Osijek	1897
Požega Prison	Požega	1974
Pula Prison	Pula	1862
Rijeka Prison	Rijeka	1905
Sisak Prison (Note: Temporarily in Zagreb Training Centre due to damage caused by the 2020 Petrinja earthquake.)	Zagreb	
Split Prison	Split	1986
Šibenik Prison	Šibenik	1905
Varaždin Prison	Varaždin	1963
Zadar Prison	Zadar	1904
Zagreb Prison	Zagreb	1987

== Reformatories ==
Name	Location	Opened
Turopolje Reformatory	Velika Gorica	1902
Požega Reformatory	Požega	1915

== Diagnostics centres ==
Name	Location	Opened
Zagreb Diagnostics Centre	Zagreb	1987
