= Lokvičići =

Municipality in Split-Dalmatia County, Croatia

- Location within Croatia
- Coordinates: 43°30′0″N 17°3′36″E
- Country: Croatia
- Region: Dalmatian Hinterland
- County: Split-Dalmatia County

Area
  - Total: 28.5 km^{2} (11.0 sq mi)

Population (2021)
  - Total: 667
  - Density: 23.4/km^{2} (60.6/sq mi)
- Time zone: UTC+1 (CET)
  - Summer (DST): UTC+2 (CEST)
- Website: lokvicici.hr

Lokvičići is a municipality in Split-Dalmatia County, Croatia, near Imotski.

Lokvičići got their name after the tribe of Lokvičići, consisting of several villages and several hamlets including Berinovac, Kljenovac, Poboj, Lokvičići, Vidulini, Dolića Draga Gornja and Dolića Draga Donja.

Situated between Biokovo and Zavelim with its hills and pastures, Lokvičići has attracted settlers for a very long time, as evidenced by numerous historical remains: tombstones from the 12th century and Roman roads. Nearby are lakes Mamic Lake (Lake Lokvičićko) Knezovic Lake, and Galipovac.

== Demographics ==
In the 2011 and the 2021 censuses, the municipality consisted of the settlements of Dolića Draga (population 367, 309) and Lokvičići (440, 358).

Lokvičići: Population trends 1857–2021
v

population	1003	1202	1281	1406	1599	1971	1749	2035	2118	2238	2299	2257	1815	1410	1037	807	667
	1857	1869	1880	1890	1900	1910	1921	1931	1948	1953	1961	1971	1981	1991	2001	2011	2021

Sources: Croatian Bureau of Statistics publications

== Geography ==
Lokvičići is located at an altitude of 600–700 m, and is influenced by the sub-Mediterranean and mountain climate, as evidenced by the nearby town of Imotski, which is host to a much warmer climate.
