= Vadediji =

Vadediji Vadedio
- Village
- Location within Croatia
- Coordinates: 45.130417°N 13.8801731°E
- Country: Croatia
- County: Istria County
- Municipality: Žminj

Area
  - Total: 0.54 sq mi (1.4 km^{2})

Population (2021)
  - Total: 58
  - Density: 110/sq mi (41/km^{2})
- Time zone: UTC+1 (CET)
  - Summer (DST): UTC+2 (CEST)
- Postal code: 52341 Žminj
- Area code: 052

Vadediji (Italian: Vadedio) is a village in the municipality of Žminj, in Istria, Croatia.

== Demographics ==
According to the 2021 census, its population was 58.
