= Žminj =

Žminj Gimino
- Municipality
- Žminj Municipality
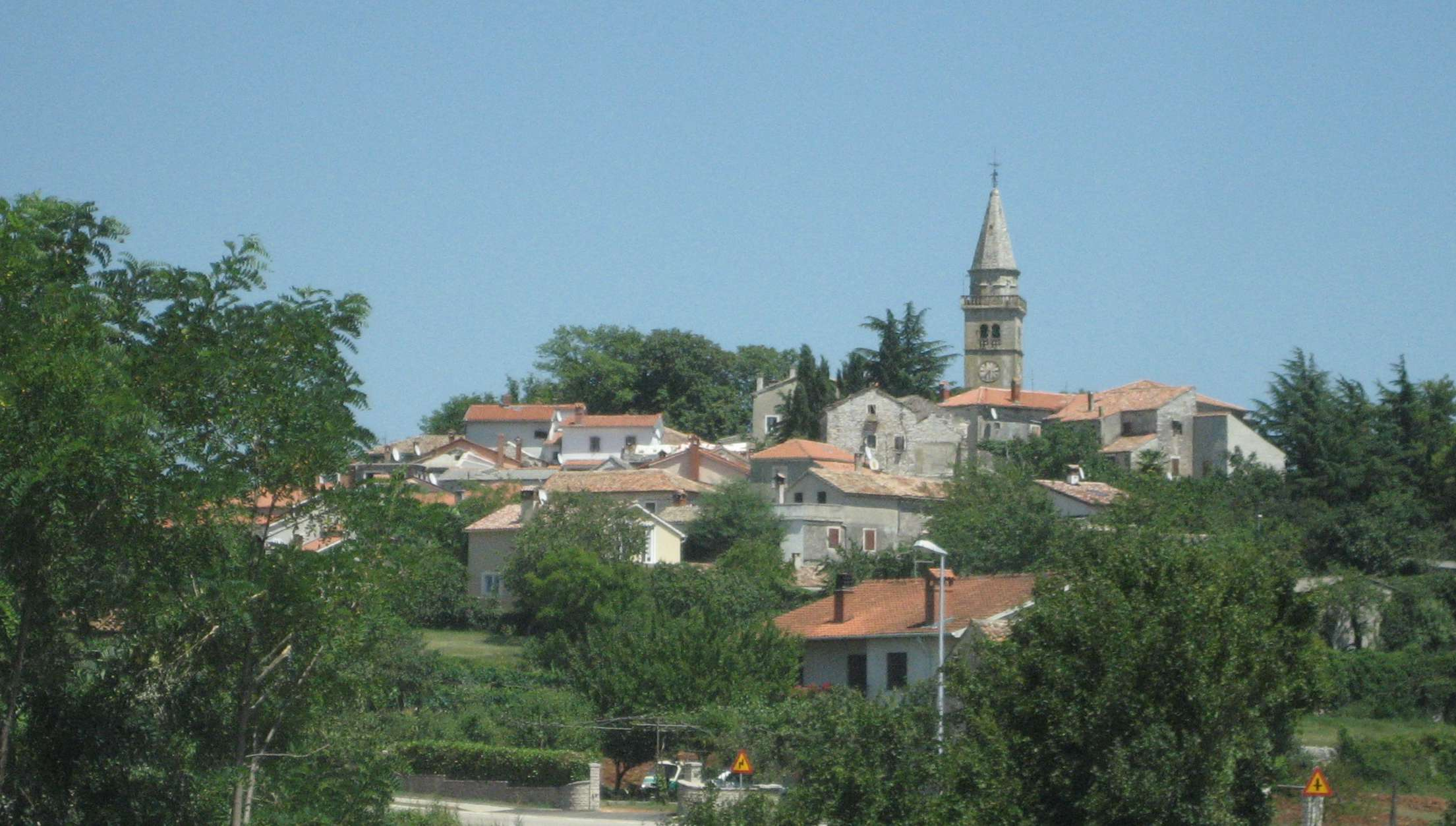

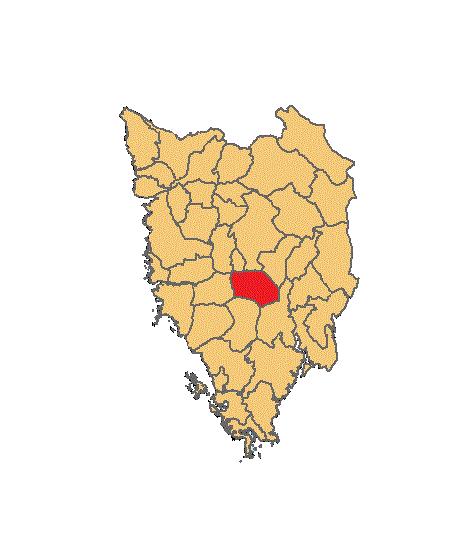
- Location of Žminj in Istria
- Interactive map of Žminj
- Location within Croatia
- Coordinates: 45°09′N 13°55′E
- Country: Croatia
- County: Istria County

Government
  - Mayor: Željko Plavčić

Area
  - Municipality: 27.6 sq mi (71.6 km^{2})
  - Urban: 1.2 sq mi (3.2 km^{2})
- Elevation: 1,165 ft (355 m)

Population (2021)
  - Municipality: 3,360
  - Density: 122/sq mi (46.9/km^{2})
  - Urban: 826
  - Urban density: 670/sq mi (260/km^{2})
- Time zone: UTC+1 (CET)
  - Summer (DST): UTC+2 (CEST)
- Postal code: 52341 Žminj
- Area code: 52
- Website: zminj.hr

Žminj (Italian: Gimino) is a village and a municipality in Istria, west Croatia, 15 km south of Pazin.

The town is located on a limestone hill between the Lim valley and the Raša valley, 355 meters above sea level. Its economy is based on farming and livestock breeding. Žminj is located at the intersection of regional roads to Pazin, Kanfanar, Svetvinčenat and Labin. This part of Istria has a number of tourist attractions, landscapes and the remnants of cultural heritage from all ages (such as a tower Citadel in the old town).

== History ==
The municipality has a population of 3,360, and was first mentioned in 1177 as a parish of the Poreč diocese. Since 1368, Žminj has belonged to the County of Pazin. In the center of the city is the baroque, three-aisled Parish Church of St. Michael's Church built in 1625.

== Demographics ==
According to the 2021 census, its population was 3,360, with 826 living in the town proper. It was 3,483 in 2011.

The municipality consists of the following settlements:

- Balići I, population 64
- Benčići, population 112
- Cere, population 140
- Debeljuhi, population 113
- Domijanići, population 125
- Gradišće, population 45
- Gržini, population 133
- Jurići, population 89
- Karlovići, population 40
- Klimni, population 65
- Krajcar Breg, population 48
- Krculi, population 126
- Kresini, population 14
- Križanci, population 141
- Krničari, population 65
- Kršanci, population 64
- Laginji, population 134
- Matijaši, population 47
- Modrušani, population 129
- Mužini, population 88
- Orbanići, population 57
- Pamići, population 117
- Pifari, population 30
- Prkačini, population 37
- Pucići, population 28
- Rudani, population 110
- Šivati, population 68
- Tomišići, population 132
- Vadediji, population 58
- Vidulini, population 49
- Zeci, population 31
- Žagrići, population 35
- Žminj, population 826
Žminj: Population trends 1857–2021
v

population	3697	3761	4131	4223	4674	5267	5255	5298	4960	4938	4378	3970	3689	3530	3447	3483	3360
	1857	1869	1880	1890	1900	1910	1921	1931	1948	1953	1961	1971	1981	1991	2001	2011	2021

Sources: Croatian Bureau of Statistics publications

=== Notable people ===
- Gabrijela Galant Jelenić, musician, grew up in Žminj.

== Tourism ==
Žminj and its surroundings are used hiking and cycling tours, as well as for agritourism, which developed in many of the surrounding villages. Žminj is the traditional host of the Bartulja festival. Held at the end of August, this festival is dedicated to St. Bartholomew, patron of Žminj (in the church of St. Bartholomew).

Other traditional events are the Chakavian Assembly, a contest of young poets and reciters of poetry in the Chakavian dialect (in June) and the Harmonica Wedding, a competition in accordion-playing (in July).

Žminj is also known for its agricultural fair which takes place every second Wednesday in the month.

Exquisite specialities of Istrian cuisine: "maneštra" (minestra), sausages with cabbage, venison with "fuži" (a kind of pasta), "supa" (crisp bread in red wine, with olive-oil and pepper) and the famous wines, teran and malmsey.
