= Matijaši =

Matijaši Mattiassi
- Village
- Location within Croatia
- Coordinates: 45.1490446°N 13.862896°E
- Country: Croatia
- County: Istria County
- Municipality: Žminj

Area
  - Total: 0.66 sq mi (1.7 km^{2})

Population (2021)
  - Total: 47
  - Density: 72/sq mi (28/km^{2})
- Time zone: UTC+1 (CET)
  - Summer (DST): UTC+2 (CEST)
- Postal code: 52341 Žminj
- Area code: 052

Matijaši (Italian: Mattiassi) is a village in the municipality of Žminj, in Istria, Croatia.

== Demographics ==
According to the 2021 census, its population was 47.
