= Žagrići =

Žagrići Sagri
- Village
- Location within Croatia
- Coordinates: 45.1353736°N 13.9426283°E
- Country: Croatia
- County: Istria County
- Municipality: Žminj

Area
  - Total: 1.4 sq mi (3.5 km^{2})

Population (2021)
  - Total: 35
  - Density: 26/sq mi (10/km^{2})
- Time zone: UTC+1 (CET)
  - Summer (DST): UTC+2 (CEST)
- Postal code: 52341 Žminj
- Area code: 052

Žagrići (Italian: Sagri) is a village in the municipality of Žminj, in Istria, Croatia.

== Demographics ==
According to the 2021 census, its population was 35.
