= Balići I =

Balići I Balli I
- Village
- Interactive map of Balići I
- Location within Croatia
- Coordinates: 45.1236607°N 13.9629898°E
- Country: Croatia
- County: Istria County
- Municipality: Žminj

Area
  - Total: 0.73 sq mi (1.9 km^{2})

Population (2021)
  - Total: 64
  - Density: 87/sq mi (34/km^{2})
- Time zone: UTC+1 (CET)
  - Summer (DST): UTC+2 (CEST)
- Postal code: 52341 Žminj
- Area code: 052

Balići I (Italian: Balli I) is a village in the municipality of Žminj, in Istria, Croatia.

== Demographics ==
According to the 2021 census, its population was 64.
