= Krculi =

Krculi Cherzuli
- Village
- Location within Croatia
- Coordinates: 45.132959°N 13.9041762°E
- Country: Croatia
- County: Istria County
- Municipality: Žminj

Area
  - Total: 1.7 sq mi (4.3 km^{2})

Population (2021)
  - Total: 126
  - Density: 76/sq mi (29/km^{2})
- Time zone: UTC+1 (CET)
  - Summer (DST): UTC+2 (CEST)
- Postal code: 52341 Žminj
- Area code: 052

Krculi (Italian: Cherzuli) is a village in the municipality of Žminj, in Istria, Croatia.

== Demographics ==
According to the 2021 census, its population was 126.
