= Gornja Gračenica =

Coordinates: 45°31′N 16°42′E

- Village
- Interactive map of Gornja Gračenica
- Country: Croatia
- County: Sisak-Moslavina County
- Municipality: Popovača

Area
  - Total: 7.7 km^{2} (3.0 sq mi)

Population (2021)
  - Total: 912
  - Density: 120/km^{2} (310/sq mi)
- Time zone: UTC+1 (CET)
  - Summer (DST): UTC+2 (CEST)

Gornja Gračenica is a village in Croatia. It is about 8 kilometers away from Kutina.
