= Pucići =

Pucići Villa Pucci
- Village
- Location within Croatia
- Coordinates: 45.1348572°N 13.9325802°E
- Country: Croatia
- County: Istria County
- Municipality: Žminj

Area
  - Total: 0.58 sq mi (1.5 km^{2})

Population (2021)
  - Total: 28
  - Density: 48/sq mi (19/km^{2})
- Time zone: UTC+1 (CET)
  - Summer (DST): UTC+2 (CEST)
- Postal code: 52341 Žminj
- Area code: 052

Pucići (Italian: Villa Pucci) is a village in the municipality of Žminj, in Istria, Croatia.

== Demographics ==
According to the 2021 census, its population was 28.
