= Domijanići =

Domijanići Damiani, Villa Damiani
- Village
- Location within Croatia
- Coordinates: 45.1502532°N 13.9286851°E
- Country: Croatia
- County: Istria County
- Municipality: Žminj

Area
  - Total: 1.3 sq mi (3.3 km^{2})

Population (2021)
  - Total: 125
  - Density: 98/sq mi (38/km^{2})
- Time zone: UTC+1 (CET)
  - Summer (DST): UTC+2 (CEST)
- Postal code: 52341 Žminj
- Area code: 052

Domijanići (Italian: Damiani or Villa Damiani) is a village in the municipality of Žminj, in Istria, Croatia.

== Demographics ==
According to the 2021 census, its population was 125.
