= Pamići =

Pamići Pamici di Gimino
- Village
- Location within Croatia
- Coordinates: 45.1590074°N 13.8660641°E
- Country: Croatia
- County: Istria County
- Municipality: Žminj

Area
  - Total: 0.39 sq mi (1.0 km^{2})

Population (2021)
  - Total: 117
  - Density: 300/sq mi (120/km^{2})
- Time zone: UTC+1 (CET)
  - Summer (DST): UTC+2 (CEST)
- Postal code: 52341 Žminj
- Area code: 052

Pamići (Italian: Pamici di Gimino) is a village in the municipality of Žminj, in Istria, Croatia.

== Demographics ==
According to the 2021 census, its population was 117.
