= Potok, Sisak-Moslavina County =

Potok
- Village
- Location within Croatia
- Country: Croatia
- County: Sisak-Moslavina County
- Municipality: Popovača

Area
  - Total: 19.8 km^{2} (7.6 sq mi)

Population (2021)
  - Total: 671
  - Density: 33.9/km^{2} (87.8/sq mi)
- Time zone: UTC+1 (CET)
  - Summer (DST): UTC+2 (CEST)

Potok is a village in Croatia in the municipality of Popovača. It is connected by the D36 highway.
