= Jurići =

Jurići Iurici
- Village
- Location within Croatia
- Coordinates: 45.1585267°N 13.8977159°E
- Country: Croatia
- County: Istria County
- Municipality: Žminj

Area
  - Total: 0.77 sq mi (2.0 km^{2})

Population (2021)
  - Total: 89
  - Density: 120/sq mi (44/km^{2})
- Time zone: UTC+1 (CET)
  - Summer (DST): UTC+2 (CEST)
- Postal code: 52341 Žminj
- Area code: 052

Jurići (Italian: Iurici) is a village in the municipality of Žminj-Gimino, in Istria, Croatia.

== Demographics ==
According to the 2021 census, its population was 89.
