= Popovača =

- Town
- Grad Popovača; Town of Popovača
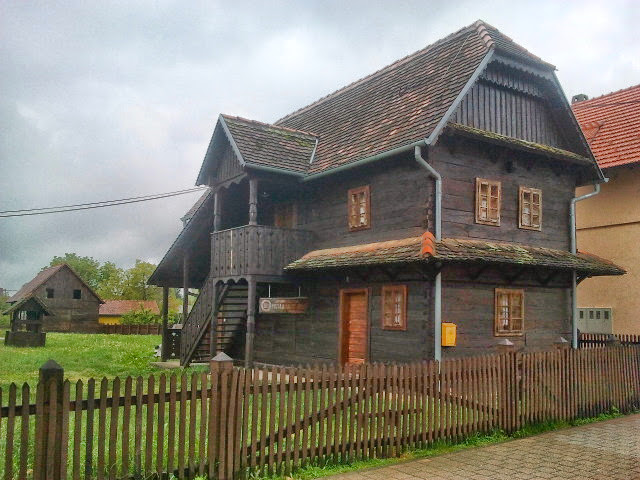
- Traditional wooden house in Popovača
- Interactive map of Popovača
- Location within Croatia
- Coordinates: 45°34′12″N 16°36′0″E
- Country: Croatia
- Region: Central Croatia (Moslavina)
- County: Sisak-Moslavina County

Government
  - Mayor: Josip Mišković (HSP)
  - City Council: 17 members: • HDZ (6); • HSP (5); • SDP (3); • HSLS (2); • MOST (1)

Area
  - Town: 214.8 km^{2} (82.9 sq mi)
  - Urban: 26.9 km^{2} (10.4 sq mi)

Population (2021)
  - Town: 10,255
  - Density: 47.74/km^{2} (123.7/sq mi)
  - Urban: 3,633
  - Urban density: 135/km^{2} (350/sq mi)
- Time zone: UTC+1 (CET)
  - Summer (DST): UTC+2 (CEST)
- Postal code: 44317
- Area code: 044
- Vehicle registration: KT
- Website: popovaca.hr

Popovača is a town in Croatia in the Moslavina geographical region. Administratively it is part of the Sisak-Moslavina County.

== History ==
In the late 19th and early 20th century, Popovača was part of the Bjelovar-Križevci County of the Kingdom of Croatia-Slavonia.

The DVD Neuropsihijatrijske bolnice "Dr. Ivan Barbot" was founded on 23 January 1949.

== Population ==
The total municipality population is 11,905 (2011 census), in the following settlements:

- Ciglenica, population 134
- Donja Gračenica, population 805
- Donja Jelenska, population 78
- Donja Vlahinička, population 551
- Gornja Gračenica, population 954
- Gornja Jelenska, population 757
- Moslavačka Slatina, population 72
- Osekovo, population 853
- Podbrđe, population 180
- Popovača, population 4,207
- Potok, population 756
- Stružec, population 687
- Voloder, population 1,871

96% of the population are ethnic Croats.

Town of Popovača: Population trends 1857–2021
v

population	5869	5614	5980	6413	7647	10400	10878	13007	13486	14400	14147	12958	12269	11822	12701	11905	10255
	1857	1869	1880	1890	1900	1910	1921	1931	1948	1953	1961	1971	1981	1991	2001	2011	2021

Sources: Croatian Bureau of Statistics publications

== Politics ==
=== Minority councils and representatives ===
Directly elected minority councils and representatives are tasked with consulting tasks for the local or regional authorities in which they are advocating for minority rights and interests, integration into public life and participation in the management of local affairs. At the 2023 Croatian national minorities councils and representatives elections Romani people in Croatia fulfilled legal requirements to elect representative for the Town of Popovača but the elections were not held due to absence of candidates.

== Bibliography ==
=== History ===
- Urednik (1914-03-07). "Iz ABC družtva". Jutarnji list (in Croatian). Vol. 3, no. 607. p. 5. ISSN 1334-1855.
