= Gradišće, Istria County =

Gradišće Gradischie
- Village
- Location within Croatia
- Coordinates: 45.113634°N 13.9030229°E
- Country: Croatia
- County: Istria County
- Municipality: Žminj

Area
  - Total: 1.2 sq mi (3.2 km^{2})

Population (2021)
  - Total: 45
  - Density: 36/sq mi (14/km^{2})
- Time zone: UTC+1 (CET)
  - Summer (DST): UTC+2 (CEST)
- Postal code: 52341 Žminj
- Area code: 052

Gradišće (Italian: Gradischie) is a village in the municipality of Žminj, in Istria, Croatia.

== Demographics ==
According to the 2021 census, its population was 45.
