= Podbrđe =

Coordinates: 45°35′N 16°40′E

- Village
- Interactive map of Podbrđe
- Country: Croatia
- Time zone: UTC+1 (CET)
  - Summer (DST): UTC+2 (CEST)

Podbrđe (Cyrillic: Подбрђе) is a village in Croatia that had a reported population of 180 people in 2011, 9 less than the villagers they held in 2001.
