= Gornja Jelenska =

- Village
- Location within Croatia
- Coordinates: 45°35′48″N 16°41′25″E
- Country: Croatia
- Region: Moslavina
- County: Sisak-Moslavina County
- Municipality: Popovača

Area
  - Total: 32.5 km^{2} (12.5 sq mi)
- Elevation: 152 m (499 ft)

Population (2021)
  - Total: 640
  - Density: 20/km^{2} (51/sq mi)
- Time zone: UTC+1 (CET)
  - Summer (DST): UTC+2 (CEST)
- Postal code: 44317 Popovača
- Area code: 044
- Vehicle registration: KT

Gornja Jelenska is a village in the municipality Popovača, Sisak-Moslavina County in Croatia. According to the 2001 census, there are 887 inhabitants, in 279 of family households.

Gornja Jelenska is located on the south slopes of Moslavačka gora.

On 1 October 2020, the village became a new hotspot of the COVID-19 pandemic after a book promotion during which nobody was wearing face masks. 149 people from Gornja Jelenska and Popovača have tested positive for COVID-19, comprising about a quarter of new cases in the whole country that day.
