= Gradišće, Bosnia and Herzegovina =

Gradišće Градишће
- Village
- Location within Bosnia and Herzegovina
- Coordinates: 44°14′25″N 17°52′28″E
- Country: Bosnia and Herzegovina
- Entity: Federation of Bosnia and Herzegovina
- Canton: Zenica-Doboj
- Municipality: Zenica

Area
  - Total: 2.27 sq mi (5.88 km^{2})

Population (2013)
  - Total: 2,964
  - Density: 1,310/sq mi (504/km^{2})
- Time zone: UTC+1 (CET)
  - Summer (DST): UTC+2 (CEST)

Gradišće (Cyrillic: Градишће) is a village in the City of Zenica, Bosnia and Herzegovina.

== Demographics ==
According to the 2013 census, its population was 2,964.

Ethnicity in 2013
Ethnicity	Number	Percentage
Bosniaks	2,872	96.9%
Croats	55	1.9%
Serbs	12	0.4%
other/undeclared	25	0.8%
Total	2,964	100%
