= Mladen Stojanović =

Serbian partisan and physician (1896–1942)

- Младен Стојановић
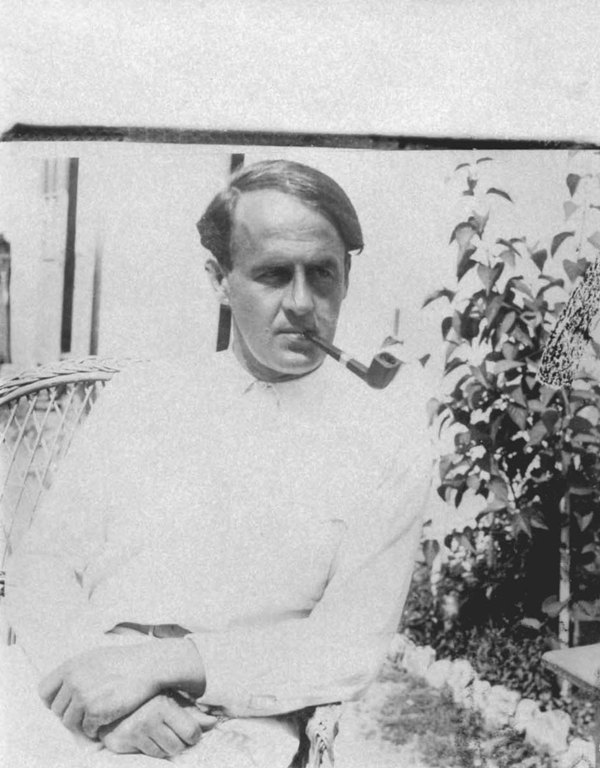
- Born: 7 April 1896; Prijedor, Condominium of Bosnia and Herzegovina, Austria-Hungary
- Died: 1 April 1942 (aged 45); Jošavka, near Banja Luka, Independent State of Croatia
- Burial place: Prijedor, Bosnia and Herzegovina (exhumed from place of death and re-interred in 1961)
- Alma mater: University of Zagreb
- Spouse: Mira Stojanović
- Relatives: Sreten Stojanović (brother)
- Military career
- Allegiance: (Democratic Federal Yugoslavia) Yugoslav Partisans (1941–42)
- Service years: 1941–42
- Rank: Detachment Commander
- Nicknames: Doktor Mladen (Serbian Cyrillic: Дoктop Младен)
- Commands: 2nd Krajina National Liberation Partisan Detachment
- Conflicts: World War II in Yugoslavia
- Awards: Order of the People's Hero (posthumous)
- Other work: Physician; Poet

Mladen Stojanović (Serbian Cyrillic: Младен Стојановић; 7 April 1896 – 1 April 1942) was a Bosnian Serb and Yugoslav physician who led a detachment of Partisans on and around Mount Kozara in northwestern Bosnia during World War II in Yugoslavia. He was posthumously bestowed the Order of the People's Hero.

At the age of fifteen, Stojanović became an activist in a group of student organizations called Young Bosnia, which strongly opposed Austria-Hungary's occupation of Bosnia-Herzegovina. In 1912, Stojanović was inducted into Narodna Odbrana, an association founded in Serbia with the goal of organizing guerrilla resistance to Bosnia-Herzegovina's annexation by Austria-Hungary. Stojanović was arrested by the Austro-Hungarian authorities in July 1914, and although he was sentenced to 16 years' imprisonment, he was pardoned in 1917. He graduated as a Doctor of Medicine after World War I, and in 1929, opened a private practice in the town of Prijedor. In September 1940, he became a member of the Communist Party of Yugoslavia (KPJ).

Following the invasion of Yugoslavia by the Axis powers and their creation of the Independent State of Croatia, Stojanović was arrested at the behest of the Ustaše, Croatia's fascist ruling party. He escaped prison and went to Kozara, where he joined fellow communists that had escaped from Prijedor. The KPJ chose Stojanović to lead the communist uprising in Prijedor. The uprising began on 30 July 1941, although neither Stojanović nor any of the other communists had much control over it at this stage. The Serb villagers of the district seized control of a number of villages and threatened Prijedor, which was defended by the Germans, Ustaše, and Croatian Home Guards. In August 1941, Stojanović was recognised as the principal leader of the Kozara insurgents, who were then organised into Partisan military units. Under Stojanović's direction, the Kozara Partisans began attacking the fascists from the end of September 1941. In early November 1941, all Partisan units in Kozara were merged into the 2nd Krajina National Liberation Partisan Detachment, commanded by Stojanović. By the end of the year, most of Kozara—covering about 2,500 square kilometres (970 sq mi)—was controlled by Stojanović's detachment.

On 30 December 1941, Stojanović arrived in the Grmeč district, which was in the zone of responsibility of the 1st Krajina National Liberation Partisan Detachment. The Italian troops operating in that area portrayed themselves as protectors of the Serb people. Stojanović's task was to counter such propaganda and mobilise the Partisans of the 1st Krajina Detachment to fight against the Italians. He stayed in the area until mid-February 1942, by which time the Partisan leadership of Bosnia-Herzegovina considered he had completed his tasks successfully. At the end of February 1942, Stojanović was appointed chief of staff of the Operational Headquarters for Bosanska Krajina—a unified command of all Partisan forces in the regions of Bosanska Krajina and central Bosnia. The Operational Headquarters' main task was to counter the rising influence of the Serb nationalist Chetniks in those regions. On 5 March 1942, Stojanović was severely wounded in a Chetnik ambush. He was taken to a field hospital in the village of Jošavka. Members of the Jošavka Partisan Company defected to the Chetniks on the night of 31 March, and took Stojanović prisoner. The next night, a group of Chetniks killed him. In April 1942, the 2nd Krajina Detachment was named "Mladen Stojanović" in his honour, and a few months later he was posthumously awarded the Order of the People's Hero. After the war, his service to the Partisan cause was commemorated by the construction of a memorial in Prijedor, the naming of streets, public buildings and a park after him, in song and in film.

== Early life ==
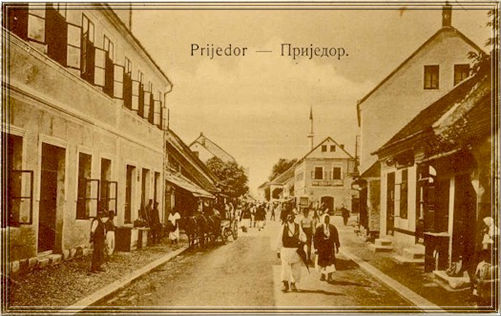
Stojanović's home town of Prijedor around 1910

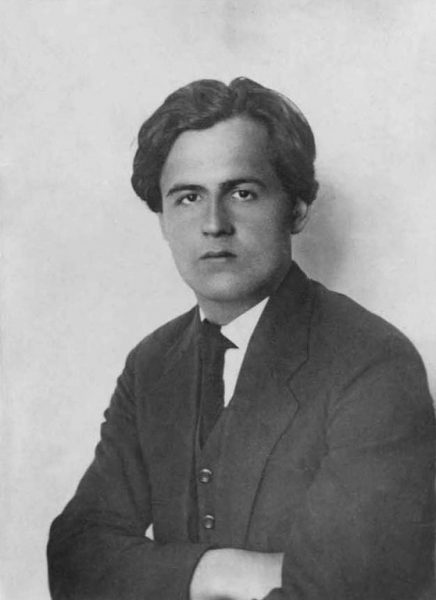
A young Mladen Stojanović

Stojanović was the third child and the first son of Serbian Orthodox priest Simo Stojanović and his wife Jovanka. He was born in Prijedor on 7 April 1896. Bosnia-Herzegovina was then occupied by Austria-Hungary; Prijedor was located in Bosanska Krajina, the north-western region of the province. Stojanović's father was the third generation of his family to serve as a Serbian Orthodox priest. He had graduated from a theology faculty, becoming the first in the family to attain a higher level of education. Simo was active in the political struggle for ecclesiastical and educational autonomy for the Serbs in Bosnia-Herzegovina. Mladen Stojanović's maternal grandfather was a Serbian Orthodox priest from Dubica, Teodor Vujasinović; he had participated in Pecija's revolt against the Ottoman Empire.

Stojanović completed his elementary education at the Serbian Elementary School in Prijedor in 1906. In 1907, he finished the first grade of his secondary education at the First Gymnasium in Sarajevo, before he moved to Tuzla, where he would complete the remaining seven grades at the Tuzla Gymnasium. His brother Sreten Stojanović—who would become a prominent sculptor—joined him at the Tuzla Gymnasium in 1908.

== Young Bosnia activist ==
Austria-Hungary annexed Bosnia-Herzegovina on 6 October 1908, which caused the Annexation Crisis in Europe. The Kingdom of Serbia protested and mobilised its army, but then on 31 March 1909, it formally accepted the annexation. In 1911, Mladen Stojanović became a member of the secret association of students of the Tuzla gymnasium called Narodno Jedinstvo (National Unity); its members described it as a youth society of nationalists. It was one of a group of diverse student organisations later called Young Bosnia, which strongly opposed Austria-Hungary's rule over Bosnia-Herzegovina. The activists of Young Bosnia were Bosnian Serbs, Muslims, and Croats, though most were Serbs. The first organisation regarded to be part of this group was established in 1904 by Serb students of the Mostar Gymnasium. 1905 saw considerable political unrest among the Serb and Croat students of the Tuzla gymnasium. Although the provincial government imposed the name "Bosnian" on the language of the province (Serbo-Croatian), the students demonstratively termed it as Serbian or Croatian depending on their ethnic affiliation.

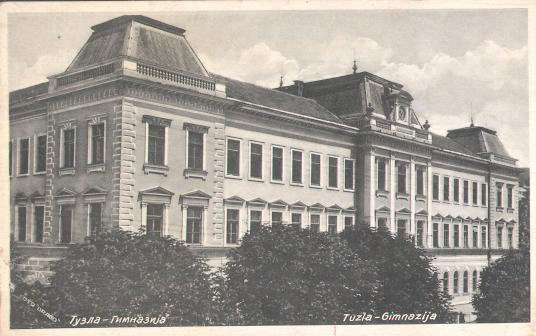
The Gymnasium in Tuzla, which Stojanović attended from 1907 to 1914

Young Bosnia's activists regarded literature as indispensable to revolution, and most of them wrote poems, short stories, or critiques. Stojanović wrote poems, and read the works of Petar Kočić, Aleksa Šantić, Vladislav Petković Dis, Sima Pandurović, Milan Rakić, and later the works of Russian authors. In his final years at the gymnasium, he read Plato, Aristotle, Rousseau, Bakunin, Nietzsche, Jaurès, Le Bon, Ibsen, and Marinetti. National Unity held meetings at which its members presented lectures and discussed current issues concerning the Serbian people of Bosnia-Herzegovina. All members of the association were Serbs. Generally, Stojanović's lectures were about educating people on practical issues of health and the economy. During the summer break of 1911, Stojanović travelled across Bosanska Krajina lecturing in villages. One of the aims of Young Bosnia was to eliminate the backwardness of their country.

In early-to-mid 1912, Stojanović and his schoolmate Todor Ilić joined Narodna Odbrana (National Defence), an association founded in Serbia in December 1908 on the initiative of Branislav Nušić. It aimed to organise a guerrilla resistance to the Austrian annexation of Bosnia-Herzegovina, and to spread nationalist propaganda. National Defence soon established a network of local committees throughout Serbia and Bosnia-Herzegovina. Its members from the latter territory gathered intelligence on the Austrian army and passed it to the Serbian secret service.

Stojanović and Ilić travelled illegally to Serbia during the summer break of 1912 to receive military training that National Defence organised for its members. They stayed for several days in Belgrade, the capital of Serbia, where they met Gavrilo Princip, another activist of Young Bosnia who was also a member of National Defence. Stojanović and Ilić then spent a month at army barracks in Vranje in southern Serbia, undergoing military training under the command of Vojin Popović, a famous Chetnik guerrilla fighter. When they returned to school, they resumed their activities with National Unity. Its members decided that Muslims should also be drawn into the association. After Trifko Grabež was expelled from the Tuzla gymnasium for slapping a teacher during a quarrel, the association organised a school strike. Most of the students who participated were Serbs; the strike gained little support among students of other ethnicities. The school took disciplinary measures against Ilić and Stojanović, who were regarded as the main organisers of the strike, and Ilić lost his scholarship.

In the autumn of 1913, Stojanović commenced the final year of his secondary education. National Unity was visited that year by a group of activists of Young Bosnia who were university students in Prague, Vienna, and Switzerland. They held a series of lectures for the members of the association, explaining their views on the current political situation, and promoting the unity of South Slavic peoples in their struggle to liberate themselves from Austria-Hungary. These lectures influenced Stojanović to adopt a Yugoslavist stance. At the beginning of 1914, Ilić and Stojanović became, respectively, the president and the vice-president of National Unity, which numbered 34 members, including four Muslims and four Croats. At that time, National Unity was one of the most active groups of Young Bosnia.

According to Vid Gaković, who was a member of National Unity in 1914, Stojanović was an ambitious and talented young man. He was determined that his voice would be heard and he liked being the centre of attention. He was severe to younger members of the association, whom he sometimes sharply criticised. Nevertheless, younger students liked being around him. Gaković described him as a tall and handsome man who greatly cared about his appearance; he wore a bow tie and a broad-brimmed hat.

On the morning of 28 June 1914, in Sarajevo, Princip assassinated Archduke Franz Ferdinand of Austria—heir presumptive to the throne of Austria-Hungary—and his wife Sophie. Princip was a member of a group of conspirators, which included Trifko Grabež; the whole group was arrested by the Austrian police after the assassination. Blaming Serbia for the attack, Austria-Hungary declared war a month later, initiating World War I. Shortly after the assassination, Stojanović wrote in his notebook a quote from Giuseppe Mazzini: "There is no more sacred thing in the world than the duty of a conspirator, who becomes an avenger of humanity and the apostle of permanent natural laws." On 29 June, Stojanović took his final exams at the Tuzla gymnasium. Soon afterwards, he and Ilić wrote a draft of their manifesto to South Slavic youth, referring to Young Bosnia in a sentence:

Зар не осјећате, синови једне Југославије, да у крви лежи наш живот и да је атентат бог богова Нације, јер он доказује да живи Млада Босна, да живи елеменат којег притишће несносни баласт империјалистички, елеменат који је готов да гине.

— Do you not feel, sons of the one Yugoslavia, that our life lies in blood and that assassination is the god of gods of the Nation, because it proves that there lives Young Bosnia, that there lives an element which is pressed upon by the unbearable imperialistic ballast, an element which is ready to die.

Vojislav Vasiljević, a close friend of Princip's, was a member of National Unity, and when the Austrian police searched his notebooks they found a list of members. Vasiljević kept this information as evidence of the payment of membership fees. All those on the list, including Stojanović, were arrested on 3 July 1914. Soon after, Stojanović's younger brother Sreten was arrested for anti-Austrian revolutionary correspondence between himself and Ilić. Beside the conspirators behind the assassination, six groups of activists of Young Bosnia were arrested. The group containing the members of National Unity was called the Tuzla group. The criminal investigation against them began on 9 July, and lasted for more than a year. They were kept in prisons in Tuzla, Banja Luka, and Bihać. In the Banja Luka prison, they were all kept in the same room, enabling them to organise political and literary discussions. They issued a comic and satirical magazine, called "Mala paprika" (Little Paprika), the copies of which they made using carbon paper. A number of copies found their way out of the prison.

In the Bihać prison, the Tuzla group created a literary magazine named "Almanah" (Almanac). In its first and only issue, Mladen contributed several poems and an essay. Its editor-in-chief was Ilić, while Sreten Stojanović and Kosta Hakman contributed illustrations. The Stojanović brothers and Ilić learned French during their incarceration. The trial of the Tuzla group was held between 13 and 30 September 1915 in Bihać. Ilić was sentenced to death, Mladen to sixteen years' imprisonment, and the other members of the group received sentences between ten months and fifteen years. Especially aggravating for Ilić and Mladen was their participation in the 1912 military training in Serbia. The Austrians became aware of this because their army temporarily took Loznica in western Serbia at the beginning of World War I, and there they found National Defence documents containing records of all Bosnians that attended the training.

Mladen and other members of the Tuzla group were sent to the prison in Zenica. Three months after they were sentenced they were joined by Ilić, whose death penalty had been commuted to 20 years' imprisonment. In the Zenica prison, each convict had to spend the first three months in solitary confinement. This was very hard on Mladen, who became mentally unwell and became so emaciated that Ilić could hardly recognise him. He recovered and took a course in shoe-making which was given in the prison. Afterwards, he fell seriously ill and had to undergo surgery in the prison hospital. In late 1917, the Austrian authorities pardoned all convicts of the Tuzla group except Ilić. Mladen went to his family in Prijedor. After a medical examination, he was declared unfit for army service due to his surgery and as a result was not drafted into the Austrian army.

He entered the Faculty of Medicine, University of Zagreb, shortly before the disintegration of Austria-Hungary in November 1918.

== Interwar period ==
The Kingdom of Serbs, Croats and Slovenes—renamed Yugoslavia in 1929—was created on 1 December 1918, and incorporated Bosnia-Herzegovina. Stojanović continued studying medicine in Zagreb. As a former activist of Young Bosnia, he was offered a King's scholarship but he refused it. In Zagreb, he reunited with his former schoolmate Nikola Nikolić, who had also been a member of National Unity. After his release from the Zenica prison, Nikolić was drafted into the Austrian army and sent to the Russian front where he surrendered to the Russians and participated in the October Revolution. Nikolić's account of the revolution influenced Stojanović to adopt a more leftist stance. During this period, Stojanović's favourite authors were Maksim Gorky and Miroslav Krleža. His professor of anatomy, Drago Perović, arranged for him to visit an anatomical institute in Vienna. Stojanović went there several times in 1921 and 1922 and befriended members of a leftist association of Yugoslav students at the Vienna University. When they held a protest against the king and government of Yugoslavia, Stojanović took part and delivered a speech. Behind the protest stood the Communist Party of Yugoslavia (Komunistička partija Jugoslavije, KPJ).

Stojanović graduated as a Doctor of Medicine in 1926, and he worked for two years as a trainee physician in Zagreb and Sarajevo. He then opened a private practice in Pučišća on the Adriatic island of Brač. In 1929, he returned to Prijedor, where he opened a practice on the first floor of the Stojanović family house, where his mother had lived alone since his father's death in 1926. Stojanović soon became a popular figure in Prijedor; his patients said that simply talking with him was curative. He treated poor people free of charge; he once sent a homeless man to a hospital in Zagreb and paid for his surgery. Stojanović earned well and had a good standard of living. People from other areas of Bosanska Krajina also went to him for medical treatment. In villages around Prijedor, where brawls were common, rowdies sang about him:

Udri baja nek palija ječi,
ima Mladen što delije liječi.

Hit [me], buddy, let the club resound,
there is Mladen, who cures heroes sound.

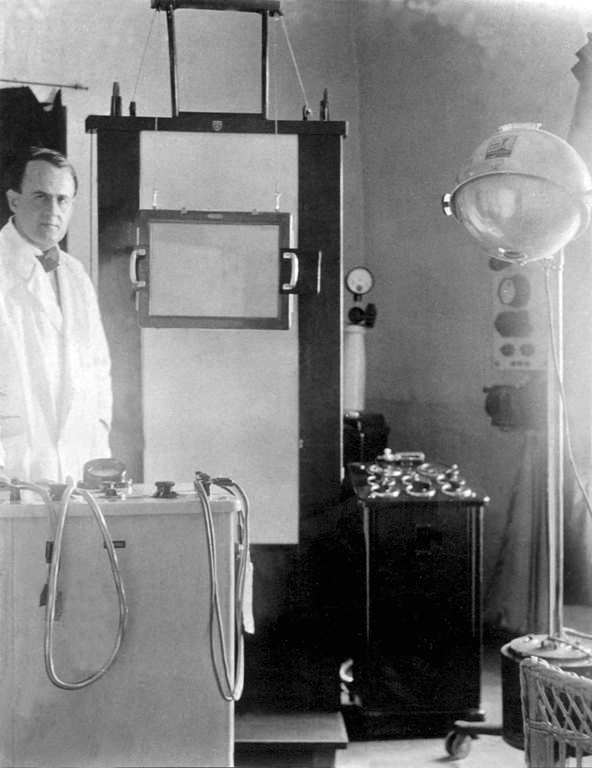
Doctor Stojanović in his medical office

In 1931, Stojanović was contracted to the Prijedor branch of the state railway company to provide healthcare for its employees. In 1936, he was contracted to an iron ore mining company in Ljubija, a town near Prijedor, and would visit the mining company clinic twice a week. He also taught hygiene at the gymnasium in Prijedor. Together with other intellectuals from the town, he gave lectures to the miners at their club in Ljubija. His lectures were usually about medical issues, but he also described the economic and social position of workers in more advanced countries. He socialised with the miners and treated their family members free of charge. He was very active socially, and also participated in sports. In 1932, he founded the tennis club of Prijedor, which continues to bear his name. Stojanović once bought new kit for all members of the Rudar Ljubija football club. His contracts with the railway company and the mining company were both terminated in 1939. The railway employees protested in Prijedor, and Stojanović's contract with that company was subsequently renewed.

The Ljubija miners were on strike between 2 August and 8 September 1940. Some of the leaders of the strike were members of a secret KPJ cell in Ljubija, which was formed in January 1940. The KPJ had been outlawed in Yugoslavia since 1921. The KPJ organisation of Banja Luka sent its experienced member Branko Babič to help the strike leaders. According to Babič, a communist from Prijedor introduced him to Stojanović at the beginning of September 1940. Babič stayed for several days at the doctor's house, running the strike. Seeing Stojanović as a communist sympathiser, Babič proposed that he join the KPJ. Stojanović at first declined, saying that he still had bourgeois habits, though he had read much of the Marxist literature. After further conversations with Babič, Stojanović agreed to become a member of the party.

At the end of September 1940, Babič and all five members of the Ljubija cell held a meeting at which they unanimously decided to admit Stojanović into the KPJ. Babič held him in high esteem and regarded him as ardently devoted to the communist cause. Some communists, however, continued to refer to Stojanović as a communist sympathiser, and some regarded him as a "salon communist".

== Onset of World War II ==
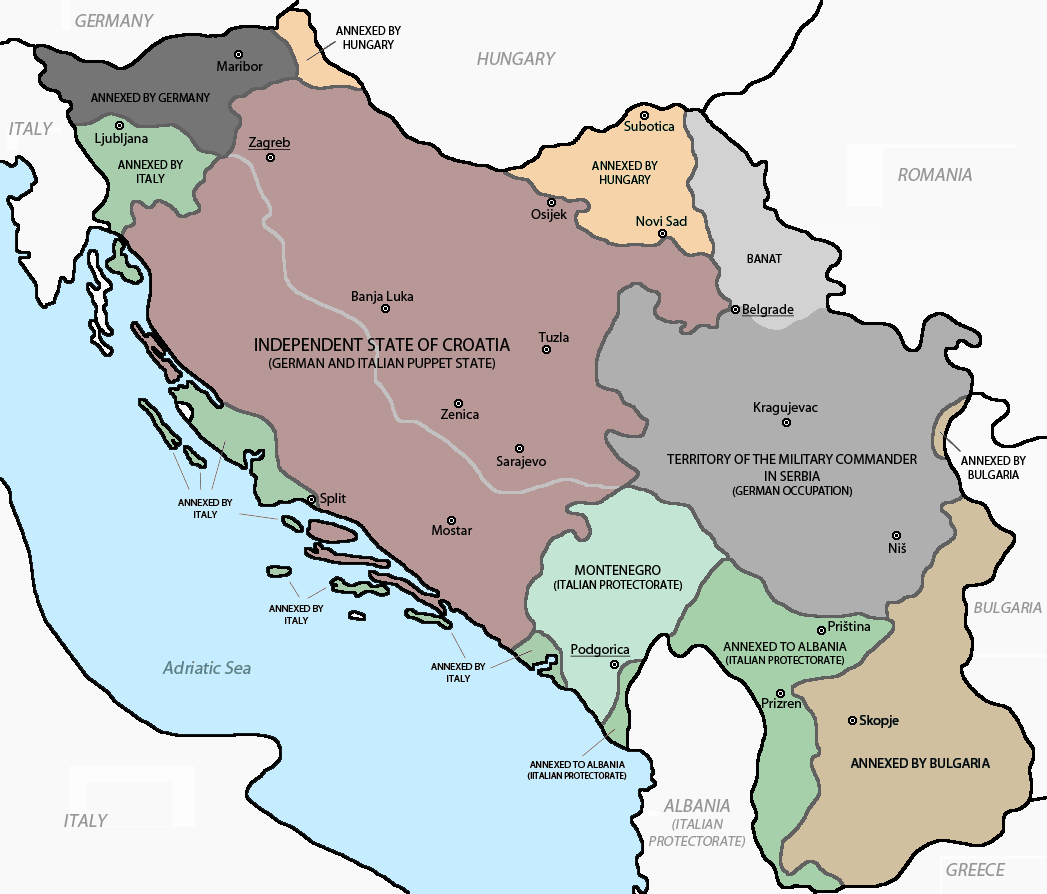
Partition of the Kingdom of Yugoslavia by the Axis powers

On 6 April 1941, Yugoslavia was invaded from all sides by the Axis powers, led by German forces. Stojanović was assigned as a physician to an infantry battalion based in Banja Luka. For several days after the invasion this battalion moved toward Dalmatia, before it completely disintegrated without fighting the enemy, and Stojanović returned to Prijedor. The Royal Yugoslav Army capitulated on 17 April, and the Axis powers proceeded to dismember Yugoslavia. Almost all of modern-day Croatia, all of modern-day Bosnia-Herzegovina, and parts of modern-day Serbia were combined into a puppet state called the Independent State of Croatia (Croatian: Nezavisna Država Hrvatska, NDH). It was an "Italian-German quasi-protectorate", which was controlled by the fascist Ustaše led by Ante Pavelić. One of its policies was to eliminate the ethnic Serb population of the NDH through mass killings, expulsions and forced assimilation, and many Serbs fled from the NDH to the German-occupied territory of Serbia.

These repressive measures included taking prominent Serbs hostage against Serb attacks. To avoid being taken as a hostage, Stojanović paid 100,000 dinars to the Ustaše in Prijedor. Resistance began to emerge in occupied Yugoslavia; royalists and Serbian nationalists under the leadership of then-Colonel Draža Mihailović founded the Ravna Gora Movement, whose members were called Chetniks. The KPJ, led by Josip Broz Tito, prepared to rise to arms at a favourable moment. In the view of the KPJ, the fight against the Axis and its domestic collaborators would be a common fight of all Yugoslav peoples.

I have published drastic laws for [the Serbs'] complete economic destruction, and new ones will follow for their total extermination. Don't be generous toward any of them. Bear in mind that they were always our gravediggers and destroy them wherever they may be found... Let the Serbs hope for nothing. For their sakes it would be best if they emigrate. Let them disappear from this region of ours, this homeland of ours.

— ~ Ustaša commissioner Viktor Gutić, speaking at an Ustaša rally in Bosanska Krajina on 29 May 1941

Operation Barbarossa, the Axis invasion of the Soviet Union, began on 22 June 1941. On the same day, the Ustaše began arresting communists and their known sympathisers in the towns of Bosanska Krajina, including Prijedor. The communists had predicted this, and most of them avoided capture by escaping to the villages or hiding in the towns. Stojanović was one of the few communists arrested in Prijedor. He was imprisoned with the Serb hostages on the second floor of a school in the town. They were subjected to forced labour, being led each morning through the town to repair the road to Kozarac. The column of hostages was usually headed by Stojanović carrying a shovel on his shoulder. The Croatian Home Guards guarding the prison treated him well. While detained, Stojanović lectured a group of hostages about Marxism.

On the day of the Axis invasion of the Soviet Union, the Executive Committee of the Communist International—headquartered in Moscow—telegraphed the Central Committee of the KPJ to take all measures to support and alleviate the struggle of the Soviet people, and to organise partisan detachments to fight the Axis in Yugoslavia. The Executive Committee also stressed that the fight, at the current stage, should not be about socialist revolution, but about the liberation from the Axis occupiers. In response to this appeal, the leaders of the KPJ decided on 4 July in Belgrade to launch a nationwide armed uprising, which began three days later in western Serbia. The members of the KPJ-led forces were called Partisans, and their supreme commander was Tito. On 13 July, in Sarajevo, the KPJ Provincial Committee for Bosnia-Herzegovina, headed by Svetozar Vukmanović, organised the province into military regions: Bosanska Krajina, Herzegovina, Tuzla, and Sarajevo.

Flag of the Yugoslav Partisans

The Prijedor communists were keen to rescue Stojanović from his imprisonment, but their attempts to bribe the Ustaše to release him failed. They also considered storming the school in which he was kept. On 17 July, just after midnight, Stojanović asked a guard to let him go to the toilet on the first floor of the school. The guard let him go and followed closely behind him. When they were halfway down the stairs, Stojanović shouted "Fire!" as smoke came from a room on the second floor. During the commotion of the guards and hostages extinguishing the fire, Stojanović entered the toilet and escaped through the window. He went to the village of Orlovci, several kilometres from Prijedor, where he was accompanied by Rade Bašić—a young communist who had earlier escaped from the town. Bašić escorted Stojanović toward Mount Kozara (978 m (3,209 ft) high), north of the Prijedor plain.

After Stojanović's escape, the Ustaše arrested his wife, Mira. His son, Vojin, born in 1940, was cared for by Mira's former husband. Mira was released from prison after several months, and she and Vojin went to Dubrovnik. Stojanović's brothers and sisters had lived in Belgrade since before the war.

== Yugoslav Partisan ==
=== Kozara area ===
==== July–August 1941 ====
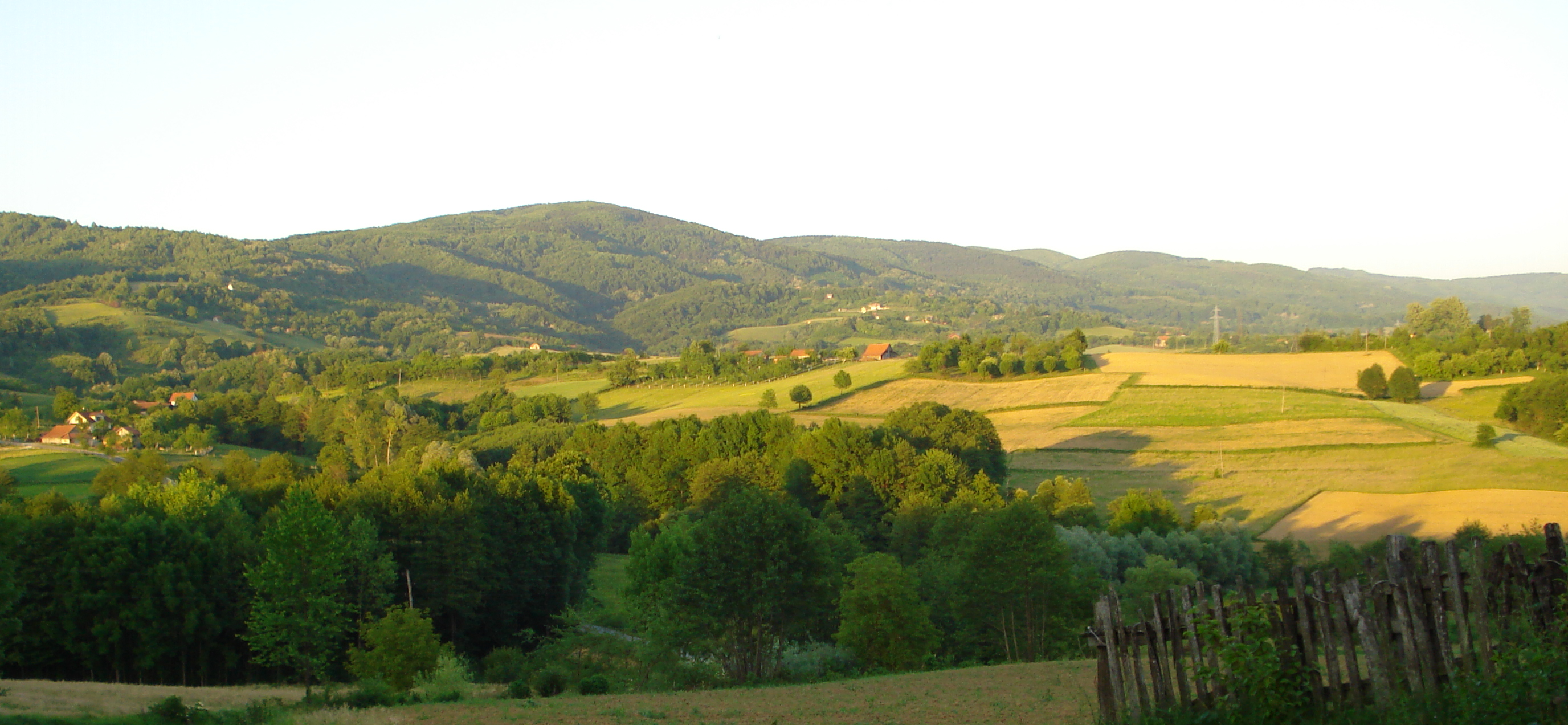
Mount Kozara, near the site of the first Partisan camp in the area

On the morning of 19 July 1941, Stojanović and Bašić arrived at the camp of the communists and their sympathisers who escaped from Prijedor, situated at Rajlića Kosa above the village of Malo Palančište. The news of Stojanović's escape soon spread throughout the Prijedor district. The group, mostly in the early twenties, enjoyed an increase in their credibility and esteem since a well-known and respected doctor had joined their camp. People from surrounding Serb villages brought food and other supplies to Stojanović and his young comrades. Stojanović gave speeches to the villagers, telling them to be prepared for an impending uprising and urging them to bring him rifles they were hiding in their homes. The camp at Rajlića Kosa was the first Partisan camp in the Kozara area.

Kozara, located in northern Bosanska Krajina and centred around Mount Kozara, covers about 2,500 square kilometres (970 square miles). In 1941, the area had a population of nearly 200,000 people. The villagers were mostly Serbs, and the towns in the area—the biggest of which was Prijedor—had a mixed Bosnian Muslim, Serb, and Croat population. Several villages were inhabited by ethnic Germans or Volksdeutsche. The economy of Kozara was dominated by agriculture, but there were about 6,000 workers employed in a coal mine and several plants. The first communist cells in the area were established shortly before the Axis invasion, mostly in the towns. Kozara had seen four uprisings against the Ottomans during the 19th century.

On the night of 25 July 1941, at Orlovci, Stojanović and seven other leading communists of Kozara had a meeting with Đuro Pucar, the head of the KPJ Regional Committee for Bosanska Krajina. Pucar told the assembled communists that military actions against the enemy should start as soon as possible. The actions should be of a guerrilla type, for which purpose Partisan detachments should be formed. Stojanović and Osman Karabegović were appointed to lead the uprising in the Prijedor district. On 27 July, in western Bosanska Krajina, Partisans took the town of Drvar, marking the beginning of the uprising in Bosnia-Herzegovina. At this stage, the insurgents in Kozara were still not organised into military units. In the district of Prijedor, Stojanović and Karabegović had little control over the men from the villages who took up arms. Pucar referred to the district's insurgents as the "Prijedor Company", the bulk of which were villagers, numbering several hundred men. Many of them had no firearms.

According to Pucar, the Prijedor Company was directed to attack Ljubija. On 30 July, contrary to Stojanović's direct order, the insurgents attacked Veliko Palančište and rescued fifteen hostages held by the Ustaše. The insurgents then advanced toward Prijedor and developed a position facing the town, which was defended by Croatian Home Guards, Ustaše, and German forces. A front line stabilised after three days of fighting, leaving the Prijedor Company in control of seven villages. Railway traffic between Ljubija and Zagreb was disrupted, stopping the export of iron ore from Ljubija to Germany. The uprising in Kozara also involved the districts of Dubica and Novi. By mid-August, five detachments of Partisans had been formed within the territory held by the Kozara insurgents. These detachments, including the Prijedor Detachment commanded by Stojanović, together held the front line facing Kozarac, Prijedor, Lješljani, Dobrljin, Kostajnica, and Dubica.

The leaders of the uprising in Kozara met on 15 August 1941 in the village of Knežica. At the conference, Stojanović was recognised as the principal leader in Kozara; this recognition mostly resulted from his pre-war social status and good reputation among the people. It was concluded that forming a front line was a mistake because it was not consistent with guerrilla warfare. At some point during the conference, Stojanović stressed the importance of keeping as many enemy troops as possible in the area, so that they could not be sent to the Russian front to fight the Red Army. As the five detachments in the area were tied to their specific territories, it was decided that another detachment—which could operate anywhere in Kozara—should be formed. It was decided that Stojanović would command this new Kozara Detachment, and Karabegović would be the political commissar. It was promptly formed with about forty men. Carrying a red banner, the Kozara Detachment paraded for a couple of days through villages in the Partisan-held territory. The villagers gathered and Stojanović delivered speeches.

Croatian Home Guards, Ustaše, and a German battalion from Banja Luka—about 10,000 soldiers—attacked the Partisan-held territory in Kozara on 18 August 1941. The enemy troops broke through the Partisan front line and penetrated into the area. They burnt houses and looted cattle and grain in the villages. Some of the villagers became demoralised, and blamed the Partisans for their losses; some placed white flags on their houses. The Partisan units retreated deeper into forested areas in the mountains. Stojanović led the Kozara Detachment toward Lisina, the highest peak of Kozara. In the evening, he assembled his men and told them that they were in the army of the KPJ and all peoples of Yugoslavia, so they could not allow themselves to be attached to any specific village or area. He advised those who could not detach themselves from their homes to lay down their weapons and leave. Several men left the detachment, which then moved toward Lisina where they organised a camp and spent some time in military training and political indoctrination. The attack of 18 August was the first counter-insurgency operation in Kozara, and the Partisans emerged from it without significant losses.

==== September–December 1941 ====
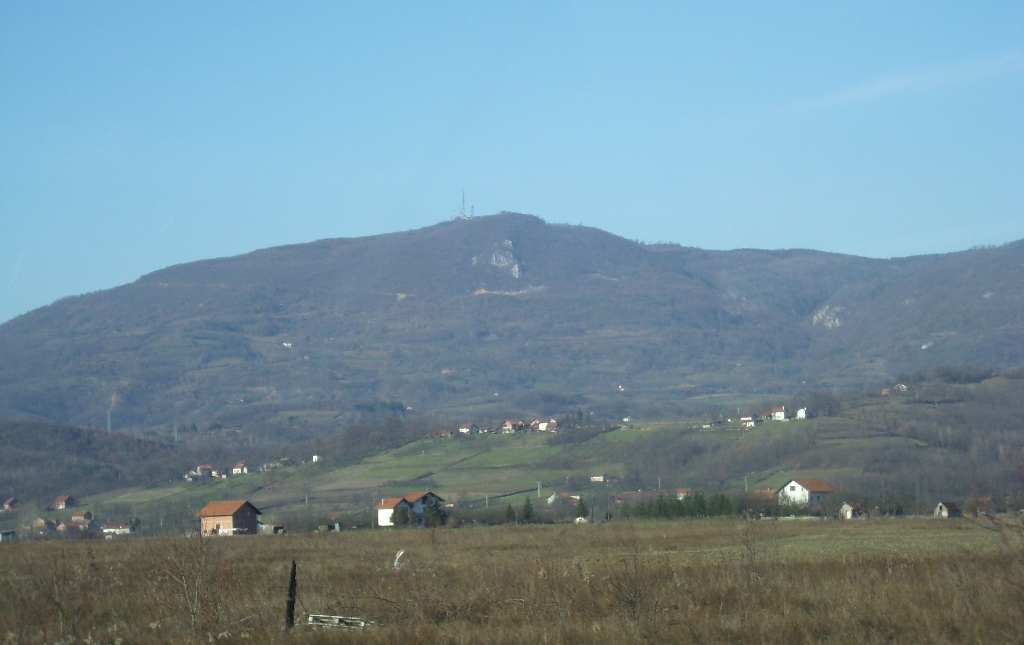
Lisina, the highest peak of Kozara

The leaders of the Kozara uprising assembled again on 10 September 1941, at the foot of Lisina. The five detachments of the Kozara Partisans were re-arranged into three companies, possessing 217 rifles altogether. At the end of September, the Kozara Partisans began attacking NDH and German troops, initially targeting weaker elements. These operations gave them military experience and they also captured weapons and ammunition from the enemy. More men joined the Partisans, and two more companies had been formed in Kozara by the end of October. The Partisans gained control over a number of villages. After a reorganization, Partisan units in Kozara were merged into the 2nd Krajina National Liberation Partisan Detachment in early November 1941. Stojanović was appointed commander of this detachment. By mid-November, it consisted of 670 men organised in six companies and armed with 510 rifles, 5 light machine guns, and a heavy machine gun.

Between the end of September and the end of December 1941, the Kozara Partisans conducted around forty military operations against the enemy. Stojanović helped plan and execute the major operations, including the battles of Podgradci, Mrakovica, and Turjak. Stojanović argued that the village of Podgradci should be captured because it was situated deep within Kozara, because the enemy could easily disrupt the Partisans' advance toward other villages of the district of Gradiška, and because there was a sawmill in Podgradci which supplied the NDH and Germans. On 23 October 1941, Partisans under Stojanović's command took Podgradci after five hours of fighting. The sawmill and its stored products—including a large quantity of railroad ties, with which the Germans were allegedly planning to repair railways destroyed by Soviet partisans in occupied Ukraine—were burnt down. Stojanović saw this action as a symbolic collaboration with the Red Army. A number of Ustaše and Croatian Home Guards were captured in Podgradci. The Ustaše were promptly executed, and the Home Guards were given a speech by Stojanović before the Partisans gave them food and escorted them across the Una River.

The third counter-insurgency operation in Kozara was undertaken at the end of November 1941 by about 19,000 Croatian Home Guards, Ustaše, and Germans. The Partisans emerged from the operation without significant losses, though NDH propaganda claimed that the rebels in Kozara were destroyed and that Stojanović had been killed. The Kozara Partisans never repeated the mistake of frontal resistance. When stronger enemy forces advanced toward them, they manoeuvred to position themselves behind the attackers, thus avoiding battles they could not win. The Partisans therefore did not defend villages. During the third counter-insurgency operation, the Ustaše and Germans killed hundreds of Serb civilians in the villages, resulting in a loss of support for the Partisans among the population. Stojanović thought that a significant victory over the enemy would be the best way to restore the lost support.

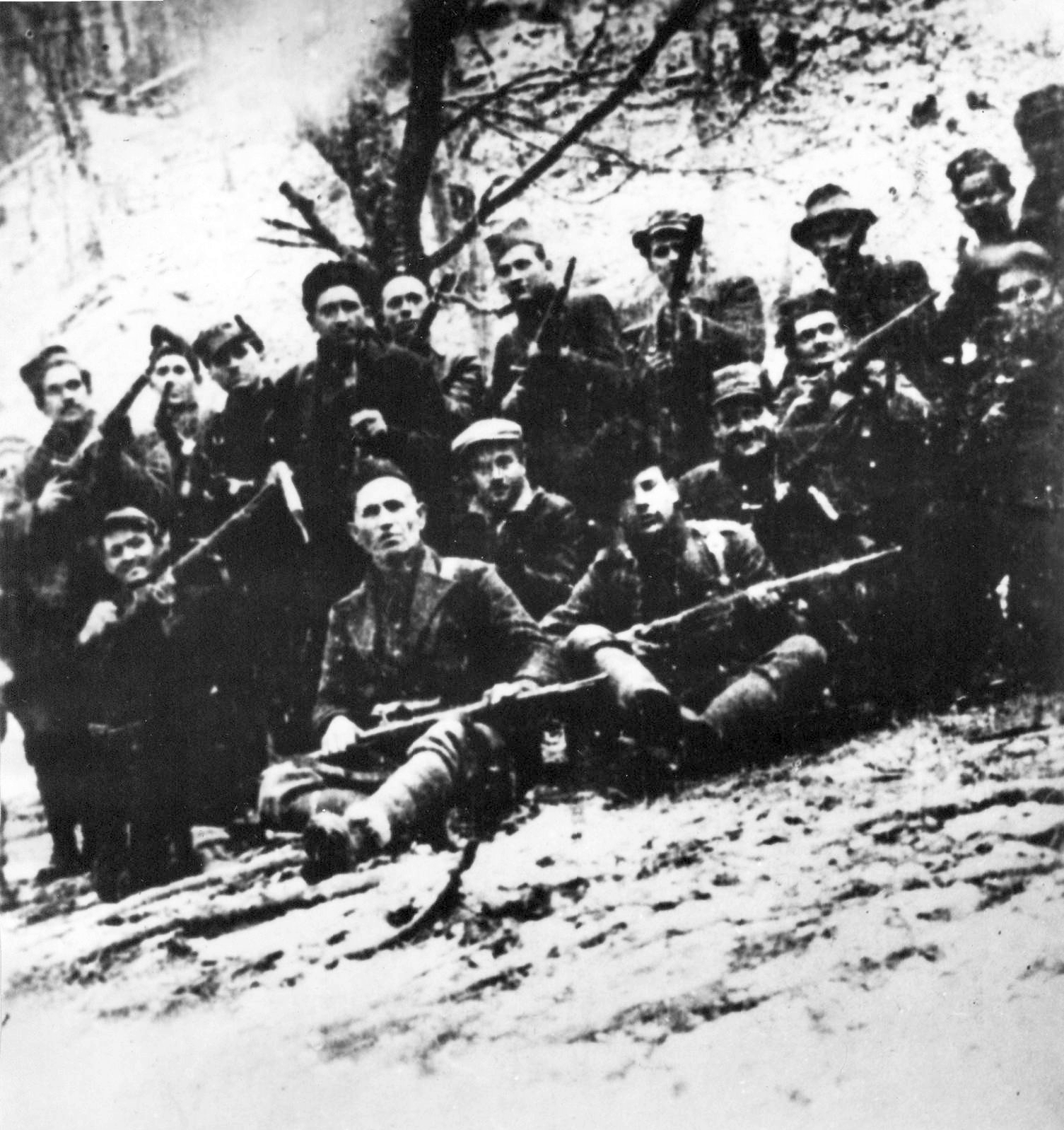
Partisans of the 2nd Krajina Detachment, winter 1941–42

After the third counter-insurgency operation, a battalion of the Croatian Home Guard was stationed on Mrakovica, a peak in Kozara. Stojanović ordered an attack by five companies of the 2nd Krajina Detachment on the battalion, which began on 5 December 1941 at 5:30 am. The battle ended by 9:30 am with a decisive victory to the Partisans. They lost five men, while 78 Home Guards were killed and around 200 were captured. The Partisans seized 155 rifles, 12 light and 6 heavy machine guns, 4 mortars, 120 mortar rounds, and 19,000 rounds of small arms ammunition. The last action of the 2nd Krajina Detachment under Stojanović's command was the battle of Turjak. Four companies of the detachment attacked and captured the village on 16 December 1941, taking 134 Home Guards prisoner. Letters written by the Home Guards to their families revealed their extremely low morale. The capture of Turjak opened up the district of Gradiška to the Kozara Partisans. The Home Guards retreated from Podgradci without significant resistance. Soon, most of the district was under Partisan control and Stojanović's detachment controlled most of Mount Kozara and the surrounding Potkozarje region.

More men joined Stojanović's detachment, and at the end of 1941 it had over one thousand well-armed soldiers organised in three battalions of three companies each. The detachment established good relations with the Muslim population of the area, with a number of Muslims from Kozarac joining the Partisans. On 21 December at Lisina, Pucar held a meeting with the communists of Kozara. At the meeting, Stojanović presented a short history of the uprising in Kozara. Pucar stated that the 2nd Krajina was the best-organised detachment in Bosanska Krajina.

On 24 December, the Home Guard's Banja Luka headquarters offered a reward for Stojanović. A Home Guard document described him as the most intelligent and dangerous rebel leader, who planned and carried out attacks in a highly systematic manner. The headquarters was especially concerned about Stojanović's treatment of captured Home Guards: he would give them a communist propaganda speech, offer them food and cigarettes, dress their wounds, and let them go home. According to the headquarters, this treatment rendered these particular Home Guards useless in future operations against the Partisans. According to Drago Karasijević, the courage and fighting spirit of the Kozara Partisans became famous in Bosanska Krajina, in other parts of Bosnia and in the areas of the NDH bordering on Bosnia. In the villages of Kozara, people sang about Stojanović:

Ide Mladen vodi partizane
Razveo ih na sve čet'ri strane ...

There goes Mladen, leading the Partisans
He spread them out to all four directions ...

=== Grmeč area ===
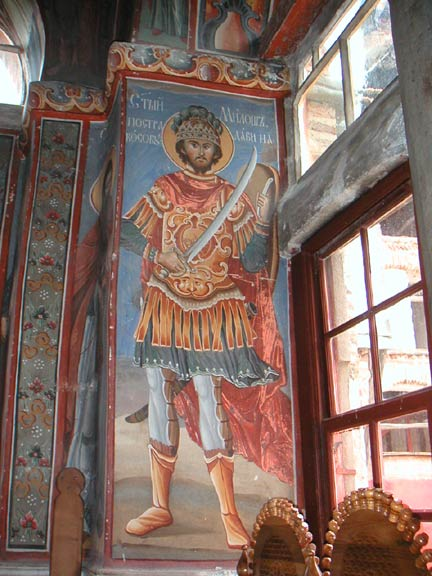
Serbian epic hero Miloš Obilić, with whom Stojanović was compared by villagers in Grmeč

On 29 or 30 December 1941, Stojanović arrived in the area of Grmeč in western Bosanska Krajina, which was in the zone of responsibility of the 1st Krajina National Liberation Partisan Detachment. This zone also included Drvar, where the uprising in Bosnia-Herzegovina began. The military activities of the Partisans there diminished after the capture of Drvar by Italian troops on 25 September 1941. In the Italians' propaganda, they presented themselves as protectors of the Serbian people against the Ustaše. Groups of Serbs collaborated with the Italians. According to Karabegović, the Partisans of the 1st Krajina Detachment became more active after Pucar held a conference with their commanders on 15 December 1941, but this activity was still weak in northern parts of Grmeč. Stojanović went there to counter the Italian propaganda and to mobilise the Partisans against the Italians and their collaborators; he was accompanied by Karabegović.

According to the writer Branko Ćopić, who was a Partisan in Grmeč, Stojanović was greeted by a crowd of villagers and welcomed with the traditional bread and salt ceremony when he crossed the Sana River. Prominent villagers shook hands with him, and they compared him with Miloš Obilić—a famous Serbian epic hero from the medieval Battle of Kosovo. Several women approached Stojanović to kiss his hands; he declined this mark of respect, saying that he was not a priest but a communist.

Stojanović visited the villages in the area, inspecting individual companies and platoons of the 1st Krajina Detachment. His visits were accompanied by parades of Partisan units and by mass gatherings. Partisan songs were sung, slogans were shouted, and banners were waved. Stojanović gave speeches to the villagers and soldiers. He said that the Italian troops in the area were not protectors of the Serbs, but occupiers and enemies. He branded those who collaborated with the Italians as traitors to the Serbian people. Stojanović's speeches were not well received by some people, who spread rumours that he was not Mladen Stojanović, but a "Turk" (Muslim) impersonator. According to them, Stojanović had been killed by the Ustaše in August 1941 and the communists were using an impersonator to deceive the people. Few people gave credence to these rumours.

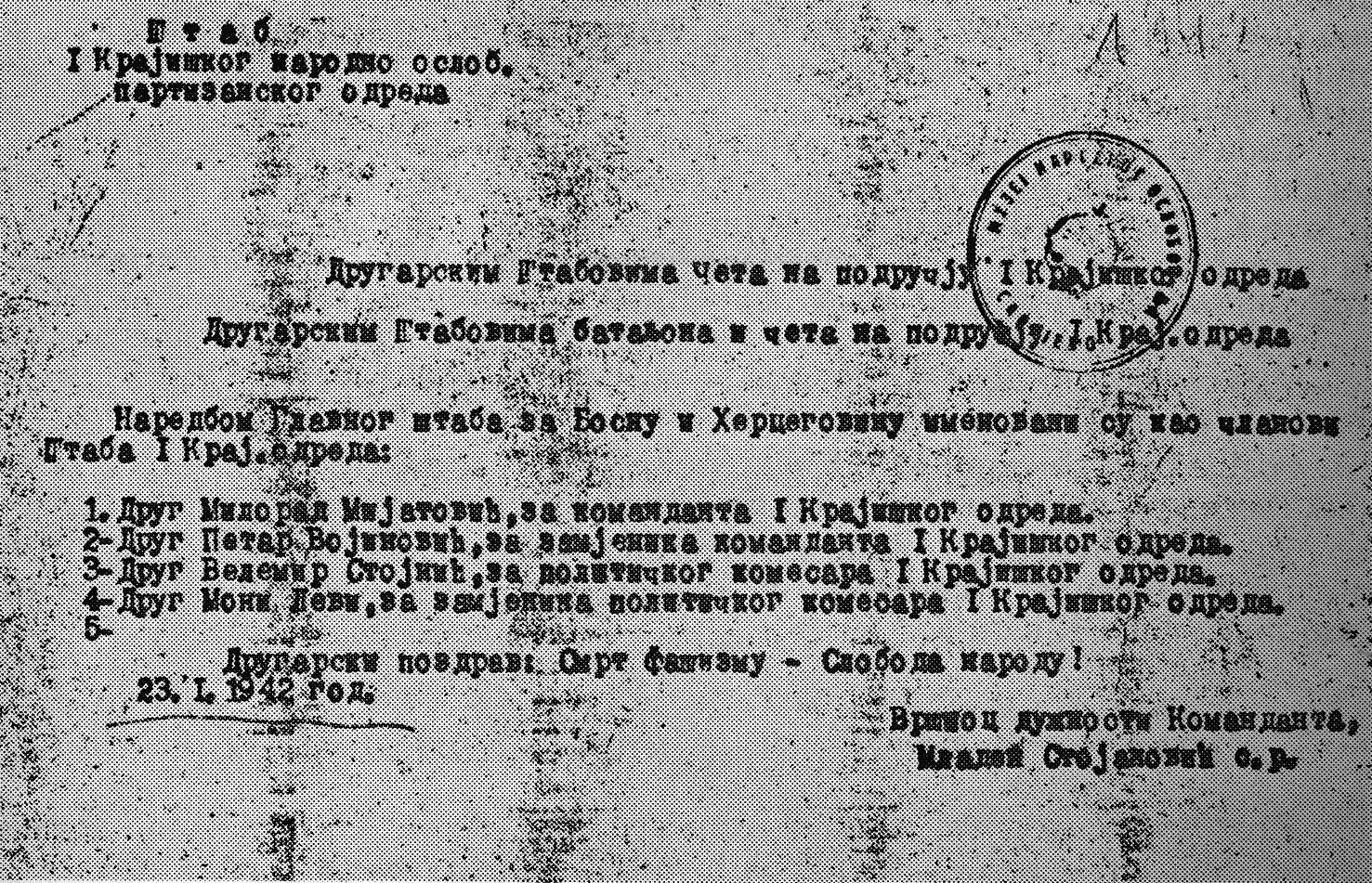
Document dated 23 January 1942 in which Stojanović informs the companies of the 1st Krajina Detachment about Milorad Mijatović's appointment as detachment commander

On 22 January 1942, at the headquarters of the 1st Krajina Detachment in the village of Majkić Japra, Stojanović presided over a conference of the detachment staff and political activists of Grmeč. He criticised the detachment headquarters because it had no division of functions and there was no personal accountability among its members. He also stated the headquarters had no communication with the companies of the detachment, did not act as a military-political leadership, and there were no designated couriers available at all times at the headquarters. Stojanović was generally pleased with the Grmeč Partisans, describing them as courageous, enthusiastic, firm, and trustworthy but somewhat inexperienced. However, he said that the platoons of the detachment were dispersed in villages and had no contact with each other. In this way, according to Stojanović, the Partisans were losing their soldierly characteristics and becoming more like peasants. Stojanović criticised the views of some Partisans that political commissars should be abolished. He warned that the Partisans who wore emblems other than the red star would be punished for indiscipline.

At the conference, Stojanović installed Milorad Mijatović—a Partisan from Kozara—as the new commander of the 1st Krajina and Petar Vojnović as deputy commander, while Velimir Stojnić and Salamon "Moni" Levi remained as commissar and deputy commissar, respectively. Levi was an acquaintance of Stojanović's from his visits to Vienna in 1921 and 1922. During his tour of Grmeč, Stojanović met the young writer Branko Ćopić, and encouraged him to write poetry about the fight of the Partisans. Stojanović said poetry was more acceptable for the Partisans than prose. "Poetry and revolution," he remarked, "always go hand in hand." He stayed in the area until mid-February 1942. The Partisan leadership of Bosnia-Herzegovina considered that Stojanović had successfully countered the Italian propaganda and improved the condition of the 1st Krajina Detachment during his tour.

=== North-west central Bosnia ===
Stojanović left Grmeč and went to Skender Vakuf in northwest central Bosnia to participate in the first regional conference of the KPJ in Bosanska Krajina, which was held from 21 to 23 February 1942. In the Partisan territorial structure, the military-political region of Bosanska Krajina included central Bosnia. At the Skender Vakuf conference, presided over by Pucar, Stojanović and Karabegović, the participants analysed the military and political situation in the region. The increase of Chetnik influence—which was strongest in southeastern Bosanska Krajina and northwest central Bosnia in the zones of responsibility of the 3rd and 4th Krajina Detachments—was a big problem for the KPJ. A number of Partisans of these detachments joined the Chetnik side. Only in Kozara had Chetnik influence been held at bay. At the conference, Stojanović was appointed to lead a unified command of Partisan forces in Bosanska Krajina, but on 24 February he was replaced with Kosta Nađ. The unified command was named the Operational Headquarters for Bosanska Krajina, and Stojanović became its chief of staff and deputy commander.

According to Nađ, the split between the Partisans and the Chetniks in Bosanska Krajina and central Bosnia began on 14 December 1941 in the village of Javorani. Lazar Tešanović, the schoolteacher in Javorani, influenced members of the local Partisan unit to join the Chetnik side. Tešanović then organised a Chetnik unit of about 70 to 80 men, and at the beginning of March 1942 he and his men were in the village of Lipovac. On 5 March, Stojanović, Nađ, and Danko Mitrov (the commander of the 4th Krajina Detachment) set out for Lipovac with the Kozara Proletarian Company, an assault unit formed in February 1942. According to some sources, they went to Lipovac for pre-arranged negotiations with Tešanović, while other sources state that they intended to disarm Tešanović and his Chetniks. When the column of the Partisans approached the school in Lipovac, they were ambushed by Chetniks, and Stojanović was severely wounded in the head. The Partisans remained pinned down by Chetnik fire until evening; thirteen were killed and eight beside Stojanović were wounded. At nightfall, he and the other wounded were transported to the Partisan field hospital in Jošavka.

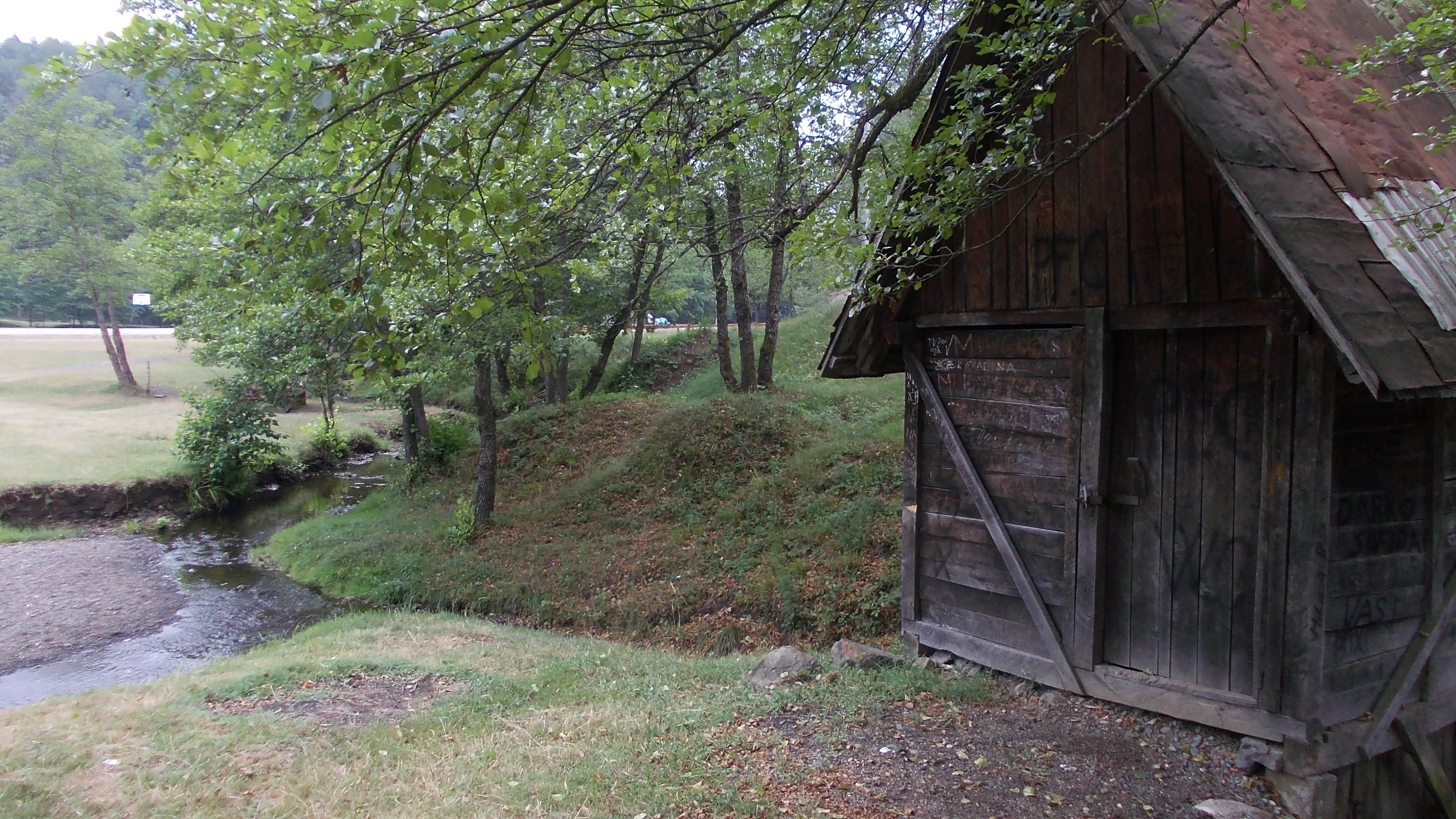
Mlinska Rijeka stream in Jošavka

Stojanović was in the field hospital for about 10 days before he was moved to a house around 800 metres (870 yards) away. At the end of March 1942, the Operational Headquarters for Bosanska Krajina and the headquarters of the 4th Krajina Detachment were both located in Jošavka. The two headquarters and the field hospital were attacked on the night of 31 March by members of the Jošavka Partisan Company, who had joined the Chetnik side under the influence and leadership of Radoslav "Rade" Radić, the deputy commissar of the 4th Krajina Detachment. That night, the Chetniks killed 15 Partisans in Jošavka. According to Danica Perović, the physician who attended Stojanović, the Chetniks took his weapons and posted a sentry outside the house. Through a messenger, Radić told Stojanović to write a letter ordering Danko Mitrov to remove all Partisan units from the area around Jošavka. Stojanović, however, wrote a letter encouraging Mitrov to continue the Partisan fight. The next night, a group of Chetniks came to Stojanović, placed him on a blanket, and carried him out of the house. When they approached a nearby stream called Mlinska Rijeka, one of them shot Stojanović twice, killing him.

On 2 April, local villagers buried Stojanović on a steep, wooded hillside. By the end of April 1942, most of the companies of the 4th Krajina National Liberation Partisan Detachment had joined the Chetnik side or disintegrated. Rade Radić became the commander of the Chetnik detachments in Bosanska Krajina. After the war, Radić was sentenced to death by the Supreme Court of Yugoslavia; he was executed by firing squad in 1945. Stojanović's remains were exhumed and reburied at Prijedor in November 1961.

== Legacy ==
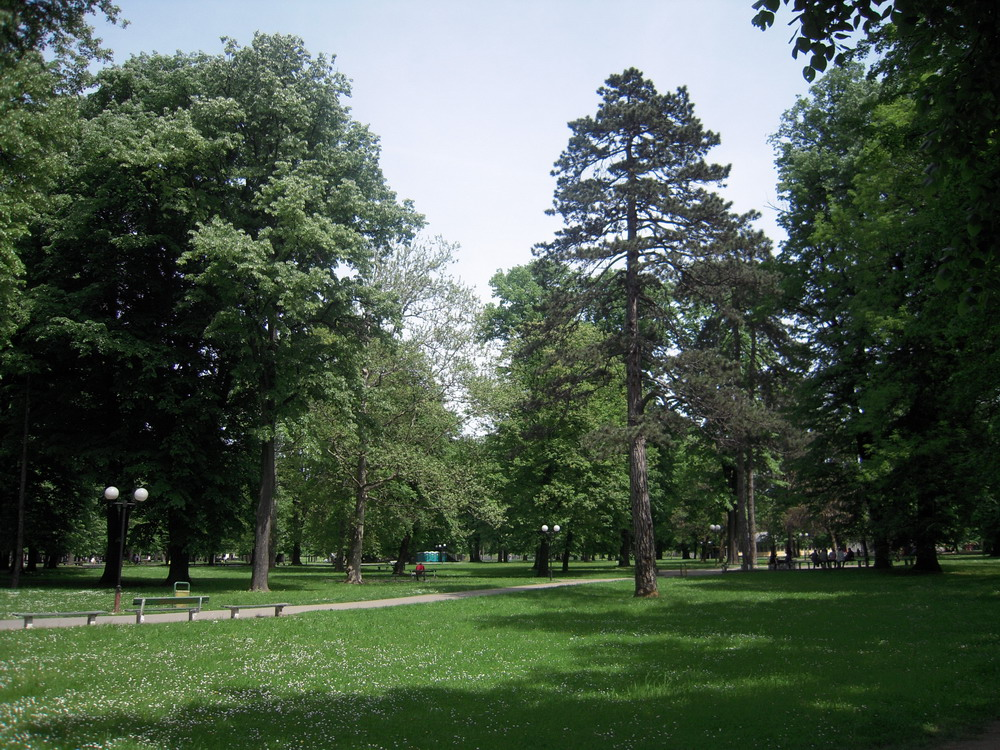
Mladen Stojanović park, Banja Luka

On 19 April 1942, the headquarters of the 2nd Krajina Detachment changed its name to the 2nd Krajina National Liberation Partisan Detachment "Mladen Stojanović". The Kozara Partisans vowed to avenge Stojanović's death on all the "enemies of the people". The 2nd Krajina Detachment and four companies of the 1st Krajina Detachment liberated Prijedor on 16 May 1942. On 7 August 1942, the Partisans' supreme headquarters proclaimed Stojanović a People's Hero of Yugoslavia.

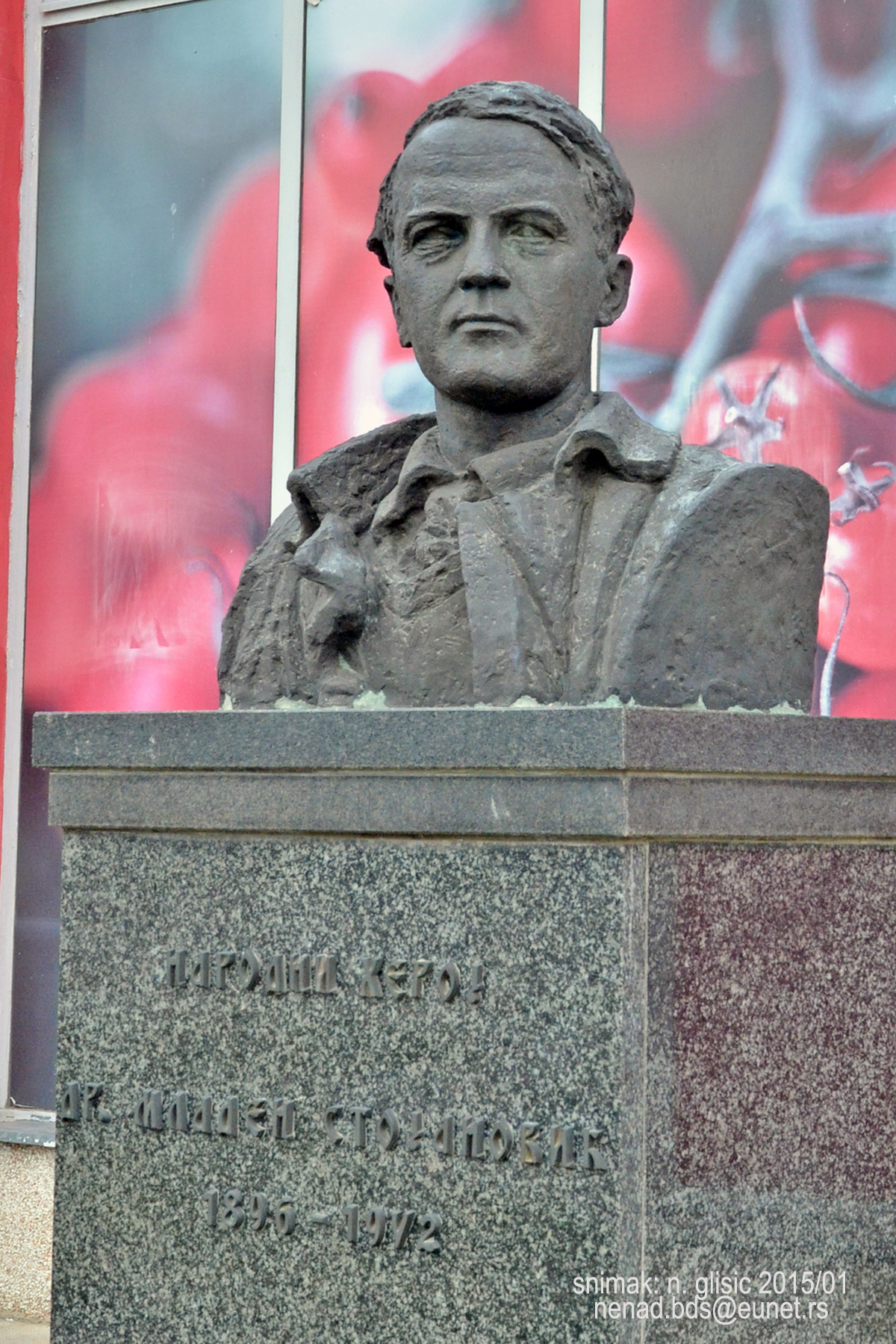
Monument to Mladen Stojanović in the village of Bačko Dobro Polje in the municipality of Vrbas.

A monument to Stojanović was created by his brother Sreten after the war and erected in Prijedor. Streets, firms, schools, hospitals, pharmacies, and associations were named after Stojanović throughout socialist Yugoslavia, and songs were composed celebrating him as a hero. A Partisan film about him, titled Doktor Mladen, was released in Yugoslavia in 1975. Stojanović was played by Ljuba Tadić, who received an award for his performance at the Pula Film Festival.

Each year in April, Stojanović is commemorated in Prijedor and wreaths are laid at his monument. At the 2012 commemoration, the president of the Partisan War Veterans' Association of Republika Srpska declared:

Mladen je bio čovjek za primjer, revolucionar od najranije mladosti pa do kraja života, najpopularnija ličnost ustanka na Kozari, Krajini i mnogo šire i jedan od najhrabrijih boraca i rukovodilaca Narodnooslobodilačke borbe. Zato je njegov je lik ostao da živi u sjećanju zajedno sa slavom herojske Kozare.

Mladen was a model person, a revolutionary from his early youth to the end of his life, the most popular figure of the uprising in Kozara, Krajina, and a much wider area, and one of the bravest fighters and leaders of the National Liberation War. That is why his image lives on in the memory together with the glory of the heroic Kozara.

== Poetry ==
In his youth, Stojanović wrote poems, only one of which is published—in a 1918 issue of the literary magazine Književni jug, whose editor was future Nobel Prize winner Ivo Andrić. For this poem, Stojanović was inspired by the Serbian epic hero Ailing Dojčin. A number of Stojanović's poems are preserved in a notebook that belonged to his closest school friend Todor Ilić. According to the poet Dragan Kolundžija, Stojanović's poems are lyrical miniatures composed in free verse, focused on man and nature, and filled with melancholy. Kolundžija finds that what inspired Stojanović to write poetry is reflected in his verse Krvav je bol (Pain is bloody). According to poet Miroslav Feldman, who first met Stojanović in 1919 in Zagreb, his poems were sad and permeated with a yearning for a brighter, more joyous life.

Stojanović wrote an essay, which is published as the foreword to a 1920 book of poetry by Feldman, titled Iza Sunca (Behind the Sun). In 1925, Stojanović initiated the creation of an anthology of Yugoslav lyric poetry. On this project, he worked with Feldman and Gustav Krklec. The poets completed the anthology, but for an unknown reason it was never published. Stojanović's poetic inclinations were manifested in his letters to his wife Mira Stojanović, especially when he writes about his patients:

I, kad se podižu i osjećaju strujanje snage i proljeća u svojim žilama ja kao da dolazim sebi, ostavlja me neki zanos i ja tražim druge bolesne oči djece, žena, majki, staraca; nalazim ih i ponovo zaboravljam sve.

And, as they rise and feel the stream of power and spring in their veins, I seem to come to [as though] some kind of ecstasy leaves me, and I look for the other ailing eyes of children, women, mothers, old men; I find them and again I become oblivious to everything [else].

== Notes ==
Military offices
First	Commander of the 2nd Krajina National Liberation Partisan Detachment; November 1941 – 23 February 1942	Succeeded by Obrad Stišović^{1}
First	Deputy Commander of the Operational Headquarters for Bosanska Krajina; 24 February 1942 – 1 April 1942	Succeeded by Slavko Rodić^{2}
Notes and references
1. Drago Karasijević (1985). Peti korpus NOVJ [The 5th Corps of the National Liberation Army of Yugoslavia] (in Serbian). Belgrade: Vojnoizdavački zavod. p. 14.; 2. Idem, p. 27
