= High School of Electrical Engineering Sarajevo =

- Sarajevo; Bosnia and Herzegovina

Information
- Type: Public
- Established: 1945
- Website: ets-sa.edu.ba

High School of Electrical Engineering Sarajevo (Bosnian: Srednja elektrotehnička škola Sarajevo) is a high school in Sarajevo, Bosnia and Herzegovina.

The High School of Electrical Engineering in Sarajevo established the School's Electrical Engineering Department in 1945/1946. years. The first generation of electrical technicians in the electrical engineering department of the Secondary Technical School had one class with 42 students, 30 of whom successfully completed their education in 1948/1949. years.

The schooling of the first generation lasted for three years, and in 1950, by the decision of the Ministry of Education, the schooling was extended to four years. Even the four-year education system did not last long, because already for the generation of students enrolled in the first grade of school in 1951/1952. education extended to five years.

One class was enrolled in the first class of the electrical engineering department until the school year 1964/1965. year, when two classes were enrolled in this department for the first time. The growing need of the economy for professional staff of all professions conditions the new conception of the network of schools in the city of Sarajevo, so that the so-called "branch school centers" are created.

On January 1, 1974, the Electrical Engineering School centers were formed, which included the "Jaroslav Černi" Electrical Engineering School, the electrical engineering department of the Electromechanical School Center and the electrical department from the "Mićo Sokolović" school. The headquarters of this school is in two school buildings, namely in the building of the former Electrical Engineering School in Vojvode Putnika 45 Street and the "Mićo Sokolović School" in Buća Potok.

In 1978, with the passing of the Law on Joint Work, school centers grew into work organizations with basic organizations of joint work. In work organization Electrical Engineering School Center "Jaroslav Černi" the OOUR School of Power Engineering and the OOUR School of Electrical Engineering are formed.

At OOUR School of Electrical Engineering, students are educated for majors and professions:

- technician for automation and computer technology,
- electronics technician,
- mechanic for automation and computer technology,
- communication electronics technician,
- electronics mechanic.

In the first grade, students are enrolled in the electrical engineering profession, and after the first grade, based on success, students are directed to educational profiles.

School year 1992/1993. the school became independent under the name "High School of Electrical Engineering Sarajevo". Since 1994/1995. JU "Mixed secondary electrical engineering high school Sarajevo", and from 05.10.2009. JU "High School of Electrical Engineering Sarajevo".

During the Bosnian war 1992/1995., the work of the School was not interrupted and was organized by points. Classes took place in the First Gymnasium Sarajevo, KUD "Lola", Kvadrant, Buća Potok, Dobrinja and Hrasnica.

In the 1995/1996. year, school classes returned to the parent building in Buća Potok, which, unfortunately, was devastated. Due to renovation of the School on April 1, 1997. classes take place in the school of Metal professions, primary schools "Osman Nakaš" and "Džemaludin Čaušević". As part of the Emergency reconstruction of education project, the school was renovated with a donation from the Islamic Development Bank.

== Concentrations ==
After a long series of reforms since the establishment, the school has specialized in the following directions:

- Computing and Informatics
- Telecommunications
- Automation and Electronics

Immediately upon enrolling in school, students choose one of the three directions offered and thus continue their education until the end of the fourth grade.
