= Rade Radić =

Chetnik commander

vojvoda Rade Radić
- Радослав 'Раде' Радић
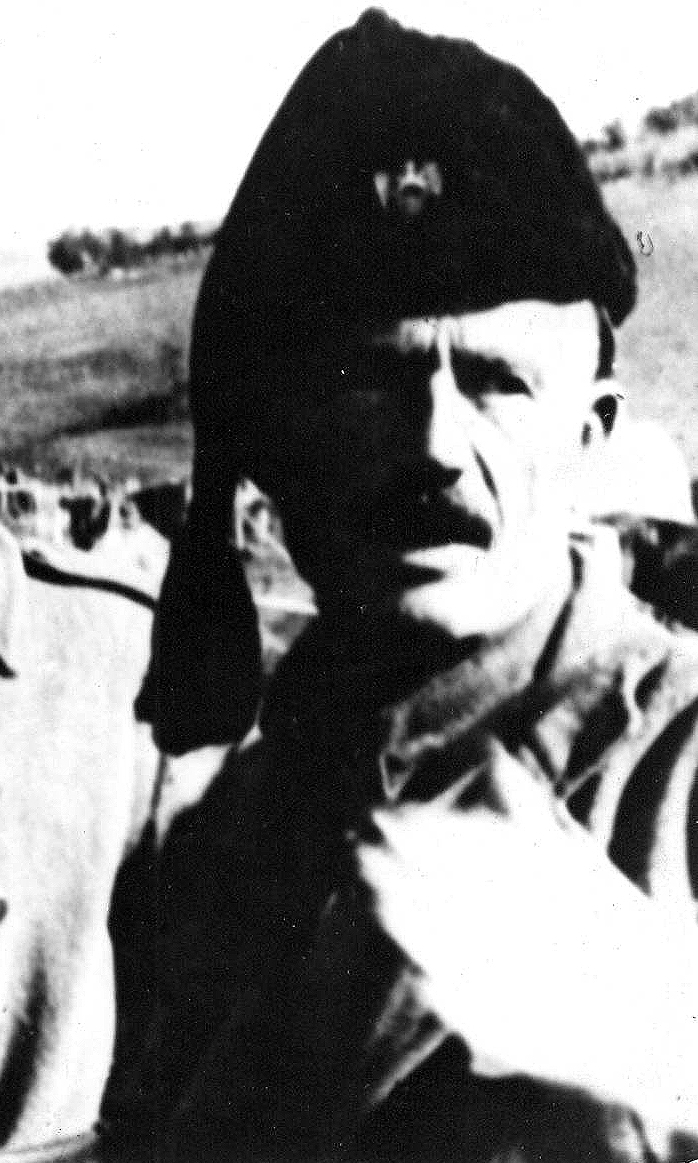
- Born: Radoslav Radić; 1890; Jošavka Gornja, Condominium of Bosnia and Herzegovina, Austria-Hungary
- Died: 17 July 1946 (aged 55–56); Belgrade, PR Serbia, FPR Yugoslavia
- Military career
- Allegiance: Yugoslav Partisans (1941–1942); Chetniks (1942–1945)
- Service years: 1941–1945
- Unit: Chetnik detachment Borje
- Conflicts: World War II in Yugoslavia

Radoslav "Rade" Radić (Serbian Cyrillic: Радослав "Раде" Радић; 1890 – 17 July 1946) was a Bosnian Serb Chetnik commander (vojvoda) during World War II. At the start of World War II in Yugoslavia, he belonged to the Partisans, but in the spring of 1942 he staged a coup in which he killed members of his detachment headquarters and wounded Partisans, after which he formed his own Chetnik detachment, collaborating with the Nazi Germany and the Independent State of Croatia during the war. After the war, he was sentenced to death by the new communist authorities at the Belgrade Process and executed as a collaborator.

== World War II ==
Rade Radić was at early stages of the war part of Partisan movement. Overnight, between 31 March and 1 April 1942, Radić and his quickly formed Chetnik detachment, which number around 100 members, attacked Partisan hospital in Jošavka Gornja, killing 15 Partisans including wounded Mladen Stojanović. Following this attack, Radić's Chetniks attacked two more Partisan hospitals in Borje and in Čelinac, killing around 60 members of Partisan movement. These crimes were used by Chetniks to make alliance with Ustaše against the Partisans. Radić on 9 June in Banja Luka made an agreement with Ustaše commanders.

On 21 July, Radić was elected for the commander of Headquarters of Chetniks of Bosanska Krajina. However, in this role Radić had just 'moral authority' and as joint representative to Ustaše government and German occupier. In autumn 1942 in Lipje, Radić met representative of Chetnik Headquarters of Draža Mihailović, where it was agreed that Bosnian Chetniks recognize Mihailović as their supreme commander, however he cannot uniletary appoint commanders in this region without agreement of other local commanders, as well as that new commanders must be from Bosnia.

After the war Radić, as a leader of Chetniks in Bosnia and member of Central National Committee was among accused ones in the Belgrade Process, trial of prominent collaborators. Main indictment of Radić was his collaboration with Nazi Germany and Ustaše and murder of wounded in Gornja Jošavka partisan hospital, including Mladen Stojanović. He was found guilty and convicted to death by firing squad. After his appeal was rejected, he was executed on 17 July 1946, alongside 8 other collaborators, including Draža Mihailović.

== Sources ==
- Milovanović, Nikola (1984). Kontrarevolucionarni pokret Draže Mihailovića: Poraz. Belgrade: Slovo Ljubve.
