= Kosta Hakman =

Yugoslav and Bosnia and Herzegovina painter

- Коста Хакман
- Korčula, 1930
- Born: 22 May 1899; Bosanska Krupa, Condominium of Bosnia and Herzegovina
- Died: 9 December 1961 (aged 62); Opatija, Yugoslavia
- Education: Kraków Academy of Fine Arts
- Known for: Painting

Kosta Hakman (Serbian Cyrillic: Коста Хакман; 22 May 1899 – 9 December 1961) was a Yugoslav and Bosnia and Herzegovina painter.

== Early life ==
Hakman was born in 1899 in Bosanska Krupa, the third child of local judge Mihailo Hakman, who descended from Polish Catholic immigrants, and Darinka Đurić, a teacher of Bosnian Serb descent from Sarajevo. He had three brothers, Mihailo, Stefan and Nikola and two sisters, Jelena and Zora. He was baptized in the Serbian Orthodox faith.

He finished elementary school in Tuzla. In 1908, he started attending the Tuzla Gymnasium, thought to be one of the best schools in Bosnia at the time, and also known for its liberal ideas nurtured by both professors and students. A year later, he moved to Sarajevo where he received a scholarship and enrolled in the First Gymnasium.

The boy "of enormous height and brilliant intelligence" was soon noticed not only for his "gift for painting", and, as an excellent student, his talent for foreign languages, but also for his consciousness of "national belonging", which in his early years already brought him in touch with the political organization at school, one that was affiliated with the movement Mlada Bosna (Young Bosnia), a South Slavic liberation movement.

After the assassination of Archduke Franz Ferdinand in Sarajevo in 1914, fifteen-year-old Kosta Hakman was arrested by Austro-Hungarian occupiers and convicted. He served his ten-month prison sentence in Bihać. After being released Hakman continued his violently interrupted schooling in Tuzla, from 1915 to 1917, when he was drafted into the army service, and then, when the First World War ended, in Sarajevo, where he completed the First Gymnasium in 1919.

== Training ==
Due to the lucky circumstance that he happened to be in Sarajevo in the autumn of 1917, he had the opportunity to visit the exhibition in the great hall of the Country Government where the work of all the most well-known painters from Bosnia and Herzegovina at the beginning of the 20th century was displayed. The encounter with these works of art crucially influenced his decision to become a painter, which he dreamed of in Tuzla where the influence of his teachers infected him with the beauty of artistic creation. Therefore, immediately upon his graduation, he sent the Managerial Board of the publishing house in Sarajevo, Prosveta, a letter asking for a grant in the amount of 500 crowns to further his education.

Hakman arrived in Prague in August 1919. After successfully passing the admittance examination, he became a student of the Academic vytvarnich umeni (Academy of Fine Arts) in Prague. He was enrolled in the preparatory class of professor Vlaho Bukovac as a "Serb of the Orthodox Christian faith."

Although it did not have the reputation of the academies in Munich or Vienna, The Prague Academy was one of the more important European centers in which, since 1897 when Ivan Vavpotič from Ljubljana came to study there, more than a hundred artists from all our regions received their education. He spent two semesters at the Prague Academy: the first he barely finished successfully, and the second he failed. Discouraged by his personal failure, and dissatisfied with the studies at the Academy and the pedagogic approach of professor Vlaho Bukovac, Hakman decided to leave Prague.

Hakman's first summer vacation in 1920 he spent in Tuzla, together with his friends from the Gymnasium, who also came home for the holidays when the academic year ended. Fascinated by their stories about the richness of the museum collections in what was until shortly before then the capital of the Austro-Hungarian Monarchy, Hakman decided to continue his studies in Vienna. He wrote once more to the Managerial Board of Prosveta, asking them for assistance for traveling expenses in order to continue his studies. Thanks to the assistance that he was again granted, Hakman was ready to depart for Vienna in the autumn of 1920. He enrolled in a private school, where classes were held in an informal manner: students painted according to their personal affinities, while the only corrections made were on errors of a technical nature.

Soon after his arrival, Hakman realized that the situation in the Austrian metropolis was not quite what he wanted either, although the abundant museums of Vienna gave him the chance to enrich his formal education. His disappointment was all the greater for having another unsuccessful, uncompleted school year behind him, and for the weakening of his reputation at Prosveta. That is why he had left Vienna before the end of the school year, intending to ask the Regional Government of Bosnia and Herzegovina for a regular monthly scholarship, to be able to study continually. This time, he had decided to study in Poland, influenced by his friend Marcel Schneider, a student of philosophy.

Thanks to the regular scholarship that he received in the autumn of 1921, Hakman went to Kraków and passed the admittance exam at the Academy of Fine Arts. He enrolled in the class of professor Stanisław Weiss.

Hakman's professors Stanisław Weiss and Jacek Malčewski belonged to the group of Colorists and were the main promoters of post-impressionism in Poland. In their theories Hakman found not only the confirmation of his own artistic affinities but also the opportunity to master the art of painting, above all to delve into the mysteries of impressionistic landscape painting, which was the most frequent theme in the works of his professors.

Hakman worked hard in Poland, which is vouched for by the great number of paintings he then created and awards that he received during his studies. It remains unclear why the Regional Government revoked his scholarship in 1923. Afraid for the future of his work, he addressed the Sarajevo Prosveta for the third time with a request to assist him once more now that he was in such a difficult financial situation, with a loan, so that he would be able to complete his studies. Hakman finished his studies in June 1924 with excellent marks. He was awarded two prizes at his final examination—the first for landscape painting and the second for the painting of acts. Upon receiving his diploma, after a short trip to the Kingdom of Italy between 1924 and 1925, he briefly returned to Bosnia; and then went to Belgrade. He arrived in 1925 and held his first solo exhibition in December that same year. The exhibition was opened with a speech by the Polish consul in Belgrade, which gave the newspapers of the capital cause to describe the exhibition as "a fine example of Yugoslav and Polish friendship." The paintings by Hakman, created in Poland in 1924 or Bosnia in 1925, were mostly landscapes, characterized by strongly illuminated, decorative surfaces.

== Career ==
Due to the selling of a great number of paintings and the improvement of his financial affairs, Hakman realized his dream — to go to Paris for the first time. He stayed in Paris for four years, during which time he came to Belgrade only once, in 1927, to take part in the VI Yugoslav Exhibition in Novi Sad. After the closing of the exhibition which was the reason for his brief stay in Belgrade, Hakman returned to France to prepare for his second exhibition in Belgrade, encouraged by the positive critics on his work.

Hakman held his second solo exhibition in Belgrade at the newly opened Art Gallery at Kalemegdan, in November 1929. With fifty exhibited works of art—paintings and aquarelles—he represented his almost four years of work in France. Most of the displayed work consisted of landscapes. During his stay in Paris, Hakman painted two self-portraits, one in 1926 and the other in 1928.

He became a member of the group OBLIK as early as 1927, immediately after it was founded. However, he had only one collective exhibition with the group—their first exhibition at the Belgrade Art Gallery, held from 15 December 1929 to 4 January 1930.

Apart from regularly taking part in collective exhibitions, both at home and abroad, he also had two solo exhibitions during the 1930s. In the year 1930, he began teaching as well: first he taught drawing at the First Belgrade Gymnasium for boys (1930-1935); and then moved on to the Technical University where, at the department of architecture, he became a professor of ornamental drawing skills and in aquarelle painting (1935-1940); in 1940 he became an associate professor at the Academy of Fine Arts, which was founded two years earlier. Hakman also worked hard to protect the interests of his class, for a better treatment of art and better relations between artists themselves. That is why, in March 1930, he was one of artists who founded "Kolo Jugoslovenskih Likovnij Umetnika" (Association of Yugoslav Plastic Artists), a group that had the aim to "unite all Yugoslav plastic artists of modern artistic views... to establish the closest connections with all Slavic artistic associations of similar views and to act with them towards developing the idea of Slavic brotherhood... to fight decisively against any suppression of art, for the complete freedom of artistic creation and expression, against biased judgement in awarding artistic prices at collective exhibitions of artistic groups at home, bearing in mind that all of those groups have full moral responsibility for the artistic value of the work they exhibit." Since such a democratic concept and broadly defined program received neither the support of artistic groups nor the understanding of Belgrade artists, Kolo Jugoslovenskih Likovnij Umetnika ceased to exist without having held a single collective exhibition nor celebrating its first anniversary.

From May to August 1930, Hakman was in Paris once more, working hard and preparing for his next exhibition in Belgrade. Hakman held this third solo exhibition together with Sreten Stojanović in February 1931 at the Art Gallery at Kalemegdan.

Throughout 1937, Hakman took part in a series of exhibitions. Three of them stand out, equally significant and interesting: two of them abroad—in Paris and Rome, the third in Belgrade, as the first presentation of the artists gathered in the group "Dvanaestorica." At the World Exhibition in Paris in 1937, when, due to misunderstanding among the artists, the opportunity to display the work of Yugoslav artists, testifying of the unquiet years in Europe before the war, to the world together with Picasso's Guernica, Hakman presented his work with two paintings for which he received a gold medal.

In 1938, he married Bosa Pavlović. In September of that same year, Hakman was deeply stricken by the death of his brother Stefan, whom he considered his "teacher" and "idol." His brother's death might have been the reason why Hakman painted little and exhibited rarely during the following two years, before World War II started.

The war years sharply divided the work of Kosta Hakman into two parts. A drastic cut was made by a time spent imprisoned in a German concentration camp in Dortmund that he was taken to in 1941 as a prisoner of war. Although he tried to spend the time there helping his friends by using his knowledge of the German language to protect them, or organizing painting courses for prisoners, Hakman was unable to endure the terrible camp ordeal. He was sent home very ill towards the very end of the war in 1944 with the transport of sick prisoners.

Hakman remarried in 1947 to Radmila Lozanić and their first daughter was born in 1949.

Kosta Hakman spent the final three years of his life in Opatija, where he died on 9 December 1961, of a heart condition.
