= Meša Selimović Gymnasium =

- Gimnazija Meša Selimović

Location
- Tuzla; Bosnia and Herzegovina
- Coordinates: 44.531955°N 18.685125°E

Information
- Type: Public, Co-educational
- Founded: 12 September 1899
- Teaching staff: 52
- Enrollment: 519
- Average class size: 20
- Language: Bosnian, Croatian, Serbian, English, German, French, Latin
- Website: http://gmstziam.com.ba/

Meša Selimović Gymnasium (Gimnazija Meša Selimović) is a high school in Tuzla, Bosnia and Herzegovina. It opened on 12 September 1899. It was founded by the Tuzla City Council and initially offered eight years of schooling.

== Notable students ==
- Mirza Delibašić
- Meša Selimović
- Mirza Teletović
- Vedad Ibišević
- Elmedin Kikanović
- Mladen Stojanović
- Sreten Stojanović
