= Jošavka Donja =

- Village
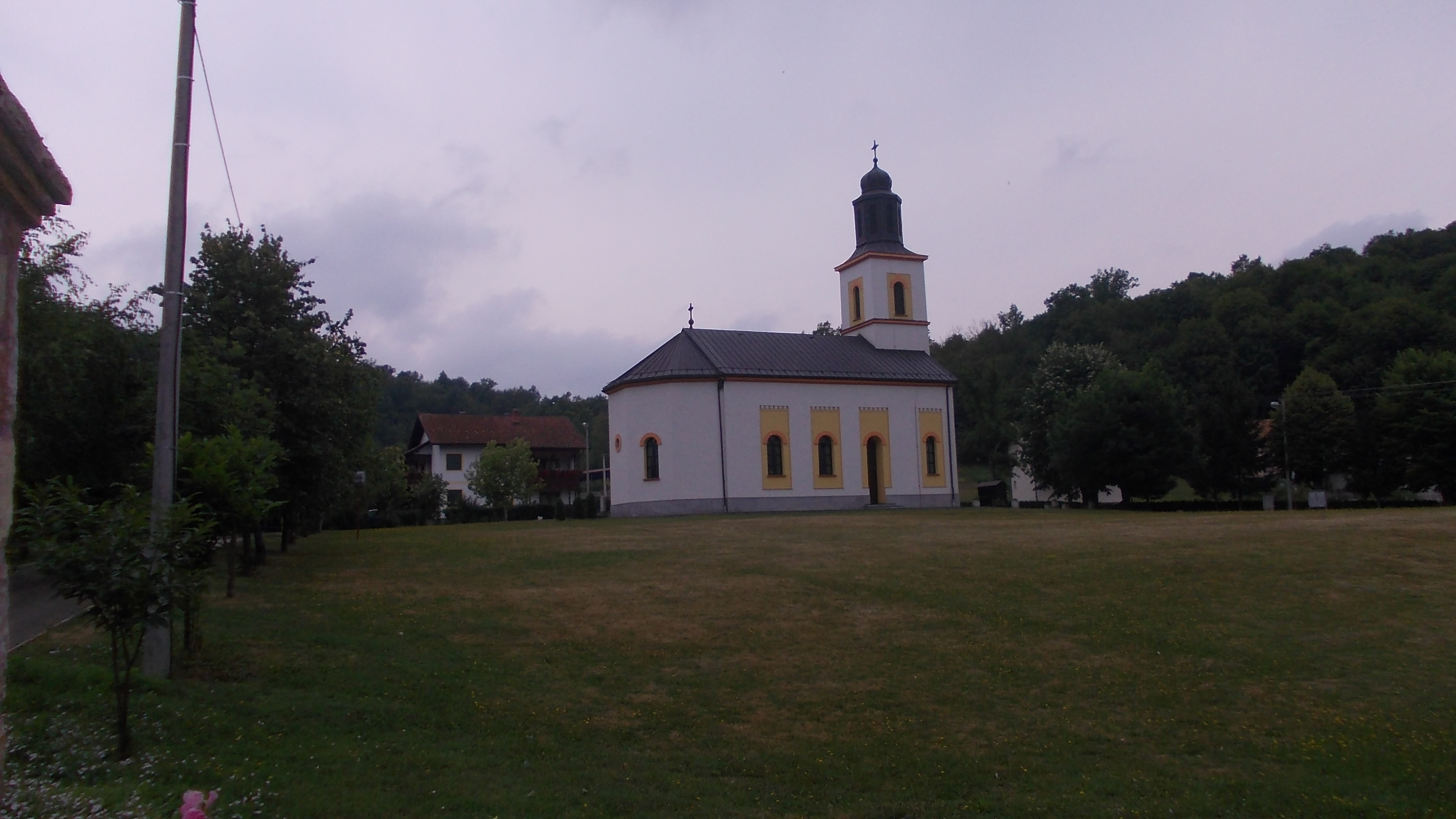

- Location within Republika Srpska Location within Bosnia and Herzegovina
- Coordinates: 44°44′N 17°24′E
- Country: Bosnia and Herzegovina
- Entity: Republika Srpska
- Municipality: Čelinac
- Time zone: UTC+1 (CET)
  - Summer (DST): UTC+2 (CEST)

Jošavka Donja (Cyrillic: Јошавка Доња) is a village in the municipality of Čelinac, Republika Srpska, Bosnia and Herzegovina.

== Population ==
Jošavka Donja Census 2013: Total of 779 inhabitants
Census Year	1991	1981	1971
Serbs	937 (97,91%)	2 208 (91,89%)	2 403 (99,13%)
Croats	2 (0,209%)	4 (0,166%)	3 (0,124%)
Bosniaks	–	1 (0,042%)	–
Albanians	–	–	1 (0,041%)
Yugoslavians	9 (0,940%)	164 (6,825%)	–
Others	9 (0,940%)	26 (1,082%)	17 (0,701%)
Total	957	2,403	2,424

- In the Census Years of 1981. and 1971. Jošavka Donja and Jošavka Gornja were registered as the unique populated place.
