= First Gymnasium, Sarajevo =

First Gymnasium
- Prva gimnazija

Location
- Gimnazijska 3 Sarajevo; Bosnia and Herzegovina; 43°51′26.17″N 18°25′25.00″E

Information
- Type: Public, co-educational
- Founded: 1879
- Principal: Velida Tinjak
- Teaching staff: 57
- Enrollment: 700
- Average class size: 20
- Language: Bosnian and English
- Colours: White and gold
- Website: https://prva-gimnazija.edu.ba

The First Gymnasium (Prva gimnazija) in Sarajevo is the oldest secular secondary school in Bosnia and Herzegovina. It was established in 1879 during the Austro-Hungarian administration, and has had strong influence on education in the region.

== History ==
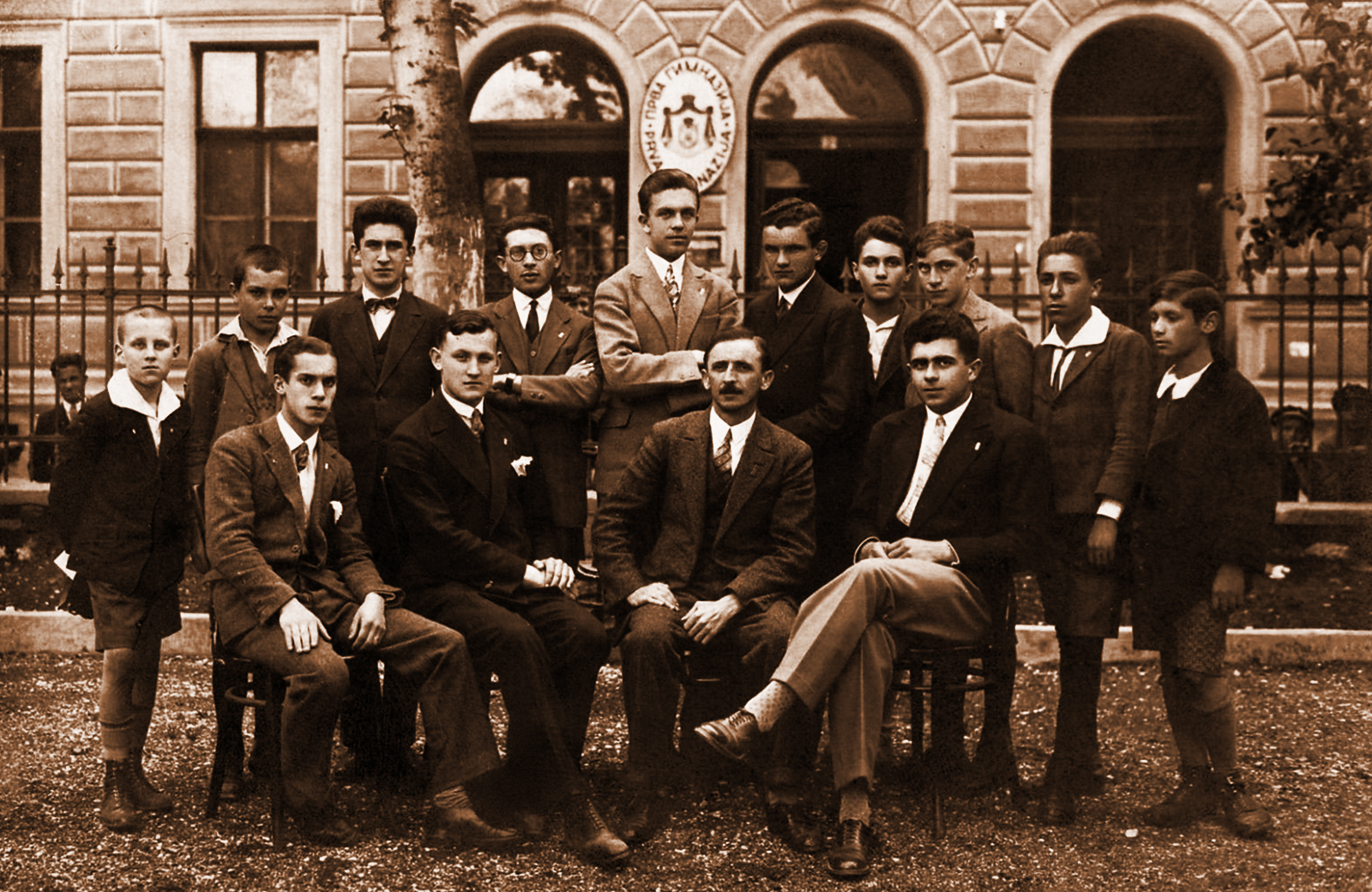
Class posing in front of the school building, 1930.

The First Gymnasium was founded on 6 November 1879 by decree of the Austro-Hungarian Emperor Franz Joseph I, as the first state-run interconfessional secondary school in Bosnia and Herzegovina.

42 male students enrolled in its inaugural class: 16 Catholics, 10 Orthodox Christians, 7 Muslims, 7 Jews, and 2 Protestants. Initially, the school operated in the building of the Ruždija in Halilbašićeva Street (then known as Kotorina), where classes were held for only one year. In the 1880/1881 school year, it relocated to the Vito Salom building at the corner of Jelićeva and Aleksandrova Streets, near the Sarajevo Cathedral. Although conditions improved, the school was moved again the following year (1881/1882) to a nearby building at the corner of Jelićeva and Prestolonasljednikova Street (today Ferhadija).

The building was notable at the time for its size and height. Educational infrastructure was only one aspect of the Austro-Hungarian administration's investment in the region. In 1883, the school received second prize at the Austro-Hungarian school exhibition in Trieste, surpassing institutions from cities such as Vienna and Budapest. These early accomplishments encouraged the municipal authorities to seek a permanent location for the school. In 1891, it moved into a purpose-built facility at its current location on Gimnazijska Street, designed in the Neo-Renaissance style by architects Karlo Paržik and August Butsch.

The chosen site was located adjacent to the former Officers' Casino, which today houses the Armed Forces Hall of Bosnia and Herzegovina. At the beginning of the 1891/1892 academic year, the gymnasium officially moved into the new premises, where it remains to this day. At the time, the school enrolled as many as 267 students.

Soon after, within only a few years, two additional schools were established in the immediate vicinity—one on the right and one on the left side of the original building—forming an educational complex. The shared courtyard was organized into a playground, now known as Metalac, which would go on to play a notable role in Sarajevo's sporting history.

In subsequent years, the school underwent several name changes: from "Imperial and Royal Real Gymnasium" to "Classical Gymnasium" in 1883, then to "Great Gymnasium," and finally to "First Gymnasium" in 1922.

The curriculum followed the standards of comparable secondary schools across Europe. By order of the Provincial Government under Benjamin Kállay, the language of instruction from November 27, 1879, was the "Balkan Provincial Language" using both Latin and Cyrillic scripts. The school was well-equipped, with classrooms and textbooks meeting contemporary didactic standards. The official designation Bosnian language was introduced by government decree on 6 March 1892, while in 1907, the language of instruction was changed to Serbo-Croatian.

On the eve of World War I, the State Gymnasium in Sarajevo became a center for the activities of the Young Bosnia movement, which opposed Austro-Hungarian rule in Bosnia and Herzegovina. In response, all student organizations were banned in September 1914, and the Austro-Hungarian authorities suspended class for the entire 1914/1915 school year.

After the war, the teaching staff increasingly included professors educated in line with the values of the newly formed Kingdom of Serbs, Croats and Slovenes (later Yugoslavia). These educators advocated for the reduction of religious instruction to an optional subject.

As of 2 August 1918, the school temporarily began admitting female students—a progressive move for the period. The full right of enrollment for girls was granted at the start of the 1919/1920 school year. Over the following years, the number of female students steadily increased, leading to the establishment of the Girls' Gymnasium at the beginning of the 1924/1925 school year.

During World War II, the school was closed due to a typhus outbreak and later repurposed as a military hospital. It resumed educational activities after the war. Throughout the Siege of Sarajevo (1992–1995), despite significant damage to the building, the school continued to operate, adapting to wartime conditions.

== Architecture ==
The school's building, completed in 1891, is a notable example of Austro-Hungarian Neo-Renaissance architecture. It features spacious classrooms, administrative offices, sports halls, a cafeteria, a library, a cinema hall, and a museum.

The façades of the building are executed in a distinctly historicist style, specifically Neo-Renaissance. All façade openings are rectangular in shape, with the exception of three arched entrances on the eastern façade and the attic windows facing Gimnazijska Street. The ground floor is treated with rusticated stone blocks featuring deep joints and is separated from the upper floors by a linear cornice. The first floor is delineated from the second floor by a broader cornice with a dentil frieze running beneath the window sills, while a wide cornice crowns the second floor.

The eastern façade exhibits a strictly symmetrical composition with two shallow lateral risalits, and features 17 double-wing windows with transoms, each measuring 1.20 × 2.45 m. The central part contains 11 window openings, while each risalit includes three of the same dimensions. An exception to this arrangement occurs on the ground floor, where the central section contains three arched entrances, each measuring 1.45 × 3.20 m, adorned with mascaron figures in the arch keystone. On the first floor, profiled pediments are placed above the windows, while architrave lintels are positioned above the second-floor windows. In the attic zone, each risalit contains six arched windows measuring 0.80 × 1.50 m. The basement level includes seven rectangular openings measuring 0.90 × 0.60 m.

The western façade follows a similar compositional logic as the eastern one, albeit without side risalits. All 17 window openings are arranged on a single flat plane. On the ground floor, one of the window openings is replaced by a main entrance measuring 1.30 × 2.20 m and an entrance to the basement boiler room measuring 0.90 × 2.05 m.

The northern and southern façades are considered secondary façades. Each level features six window openings of identical dimensions. All openings on the eastern sides of these façades are blind windows. The southern façade includes a secondary entrance measuring 0.90 × 2.10 m. A contemporary chimney shaft of square cross-section, 25 meters high, is positioned along the northern façade and serves the boiler room.

Regarding materials, both exterior and interior load-bearing walls are made of brick. The original floor structure was wooden. The original stone staircase has been replaced with a concrete one clad in artificial stone, though the original balustrade has been preserved. The secondary staircase on the southern side, connecting the ground and first floors, and the northern staircase connecting the third floor to the attic are both original, built of stone with iron railings and wooden handrails.

The entire façade is plastered, without a distinct stone base. The roof structure is wooden and covered with galvanized sheet metal. Both exterior and interior woodwork are made of timber. Floors have been modernized: hallways are covered with artificial stone, while classrooms and other spaces feature either wooden parquet, vinyl flooring, or ceramic tiles. The attic retains its original terracotta tiles. The double-wing exterior windows with transoms measure 1.20 × 2.45 m, and the interior double doors measure 1.35 × 2.40 m.

The thickness of the foundation walls for the exterior load-bearing structure is 90 cm, while the interior foundation walls range from 66 to 77 cm, depending on whether the width was reduced by half or a full brick. The ceiling above the basement consists of a vaulted brick structure supported by steel beams oriented east–west. Partition walls within the interior measure 30, 20, or 12 cm in thickness.

The maximum clear height of the basement is 2.50 m. The ground, first, and second floors each have a clear height of 5 m, while the third floor measures 4.50 m in height. The inter-floor structure thickness is 50 cm.

The overall complex is nearly symmetrical in layout: the First Gymnasium building occupies the central position, flanked equidistantly to the north and south by nearly identical buildings of the Primary School and the School of Arts. The main entrances of all three schools face Gimnazijska Street, while the secondary entrances face the school courtyard. In terms of number of stories, the First Gymnasium and the School of Arts both consist of a basement, ground floor, three upper floors, and an attic.

The main entrance is located along the central axis of the eastern façade, featuring massive double-leaf doors measuring 1.45 × 3.20 m with a semicircular transom. On either side of this entrance, two identical entries lead into a vestibule measuring 7.60 × 6.90 m. The vestibule is connected by stairs to a hallway measuring 2.20 m wide and 38.40 m long, oriented north–south. In the western, central portion of the building, this hallway links to a three-flight staircase 2 m wide. On either side of the staircase are two symmetrical atriums measuring 8.20 × 6.60 m, which serve as light wells.

At the extreme northern and southern ends of the building are rooms measuring 6.15 × 9.30 m, connected via the main hallway. The northern space is divided into two parts and houses science classrooms, while the southern space contains auxiliary rooms and a two-flight emergency staircase connected to the southern secondary entrance.

On the southeastern side of the ground floor is the school museum collection, located in two interconnected rooms measuring 8.70 × 6.50 m and 9.25 × 6.95 m. On the northeastern side, symmetrically arranged rooms of the same dimensions house a small gym and a changing room.

On the western side of the building is a sequence of rooms with a width of 6.90 m, positioned at a slightly lower elevation than the central hallway and staircase. Moving from south to north, the sequence includes a large gymnasium 25.90 m in length, a changing room 8.40 m long, a faculty room 5.40 m long, and classrooms and auxiliary spaces connected to the basement boiler room.

The eastern section of the first floor contains administrative offices. The first room from the north is the principal's office, with an anteroom, measuring a combined 9.25 × 6.95 m. Adjacent to it is the faculty lounge measuring 13.70 × 6.50 m, followed by the administrative office.

In 2011, the building was designated a National Monument of Bosnia and Herzegovina.

== Museum ==
In 1989, to commemorate its 110th anniversary, First Gymnasium established a school museum in collaboration with the Museum of Literature and Theater Arts of Bosnia and Herzegovina. The museum showcases the history of education in the country and survived the wartime period with its collection intact. Post-war restoration efforts were supported by the City of Sarajevo and other contributors.

== Awards and recognition ==
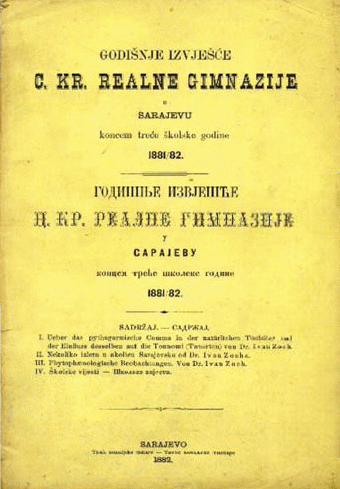
Annual Report of the Real Gymnasium for the 1881/82 School Year

The First Gymnasium has received numerous accolades throughout its history, including:

- A medal at the 1883 International School Exhibition in Trieste
- Awards at exhibitions in Budapest (1896) and Vienna (1899)
- Silver medal at the Foire de Paris education exhibition in Paris (1904)
- Medal for exceptional valour in the fields of education and the sciences, awarded by Anton von Winzor (1907)
- Karađorđe Medal of Excellence from the Ministry of Education of the Kingdom of Yugoslavia (1930)
- The Sarajevo City Plaque (1965).
- The Order of Merit for the People with a Golden Star, awarded by Josip Broz Tito (1970)
- The Sixth of April Award of Sarajevo (1977)
- The UNESCO Prize for Girls' and Women's Education (1999)
- The Educators of the Year award from the International League of Humanists (2006)
- The Freedom Award from the Carnegie Endowment for International Peace (2009)
- Recognition as Pedagogical Collective of the Year by the Federal Ministry of Education and Science (2006, 2019)
- The Silver Snowflake award for creative contributions to the Sarajevo Winter Festival (2017)
- The Sarajevo Canton Plaque (2019)

== Notable alumni ==
- Tugomir Alaupović (1870–1958), Yugoslav educator, poet, and politician
- Sven Alkalaj (born 1948), Diplomat
- Ivo Andrić (1892–1975), Nobel Prize-winning author
- Kalmi Baruh (1896–1945), Bosnian-Jewish scholar in the field of Judeo-Spanish language
- Aida Begić (born 1976), Filmmaker
- Safvet-beg Bašagić (1870–1934), Writer, historian, and one of the founders of the Bosnian Renaissance
- Jovan Bijelić (1884–1964), Painter and academic
- Emerik Blum (1911–1984), Industrialist, philanthropist, and politician
- Goran Bregović (born 1950), Musician, songwriter, composer, and film score composer
- Vojo Dimitrijević (1910–1980), Painter and art educator
- Predrag Finci (born 1946), Philosopher, author, and essayist
- Kosta Hakman (1899–1961), Painter and art theorist
- Tarik Haverić (born 1955), Philosopher, political scientist, translator, and public intellectual
- Alija Izetbegović (1925–2003), First president of the Presidency of independent Bosnia and Herzegovina
- Miljenko Jergović (born 1966), Novelist, short story writer and essayist
- Petar Kočić (1877–1916), Bosnian Serb writer, poet, and politician
- Sulejman Kupusović (1951–2014), Theatre director
- Saša Lošić (born 1964), Frontman of the highly popular pop rock band Plavi Orkestar
- Ahmed Muradbegović (1898–1972), Playwright and theatre director
- Dino Mustafić (born 1969), Theatre director
- Daniel Ozmo (1912–1942), Bosnian Jewish painter and printmaker
- Haris Pašović (born 1962), Theatre director
- Roman Petrović (1896–1947), Painter and writer
- Gavrilo Princip (1894–1918), Assassin of Archduke Franz Ferdinand
- Slobodan Princip (1914–1942), Yugoslav Partisan who was posthumously awarded the Order of the People's Hero
- Vladimir Prelog (1906–1998), Nobel Prize-winning chemist
- Isak Samokovlija (1889–1955), Bosnian Jewish writer and physician
- Vojislav Šešelj (born 1954), Serbian ultranationalist politician, lawyer, and convicted war criminal
- Karim Zaimović (1971–1995), Bosnian journalist, and writer known for his cultural critiques and literary works
- Jasmila Žbanić (born 1974), Academy Award-nominated filmmaker
