= Tarik Haverić =

Bosnian academic

- Born: 28 March 1955 (age 71); Sarajevo, SFR Yugoslavia

Education
- Education: University of Zagreb (AB); University of Sarajevo (MA); Paris Nanterre University (PhD)

Philosophical work
- Era: 20th-century philosophy
- Region: Western philosophy
- School: Continental philosophy; Classical liberalism
- Language: Bosnian, French
- Main interests: Social organization; Liberalism; Secularism; Nation-building and Ethnic nationalism
- Website: Official website

Tarik Haverić (born 28 March 1955) is a Bosnian political scientist, philosopher, literary theorist, screen writer, polemicist, scholar, writer, and public intellectual.

== Life and career ==
=== Early life ===
Haverić was born in Sarajevo, SR Bosnia and Herzegovina, SFR Yugoslavia on 28 March 1955. His paternal lineage stems from Podgorica, Montenegro. In the autumn of 1969, he was enrolled at the prestigious Second Sarajevo Gymnasium.

=== Education ===
In 1973 Haverić enrolled at the Academy of Dramatic Art in Zagreb, where he studied theatre directing. He received his Bachelor of Arts degree in 1978. Simultaneously he studied art history and philosophy at the University of Zagreb. In 1989 he received his Master of Arts degree in classical philosophy from the University of Sarajevo with a thesis titled Medieval Philosophical Terminology in the Arabic language. He earned his Ph.D. in political science at Paris Nanterre University for his thesis on the dichotomy between democracy and ethnocracy in 1999.

=== Academic life ===
In 1988, Haverić became a lecturer at the Academy of Performing Arts in Sarajevo, which was a position he held for two years. In 2006 he became a visiting lecturer at the Faculty of Law and Faculty of Political Science of the University of Sarajevo, as well as a visiting lecturer at the University of Gothenburg. In 2017, he signed the Declaration on the Common Language of the Croats, Serbs, Bosniaks and Montenegrins.

== Selected bibliography ==
=== Books ===
- Liberal Democracy. ECLD, 2018. ISBN 9789926827618
- A Critique of the Bosnian Reason. ECLD, 2016. ISBN 9789958955792
- And Sparrows on a Branch. Rabic, 2009. ISBN 9789958330186
- Lobotomy class: Presentation of a Cultural Scandal. Rabic, 2007. ISBN 9789958703911
- Ethnos and Democracy. The case of Bosnia and Herzegovina. Rabic, 2006. ISBN 9789926827625
- Medieval Philosophical Terminology in the Arabic language. El-Kalem, 1990.

=== Essays ===
- Bosanskohercegovačko uređenje i većinsko odlučivanje. Sveske za javno pravo 29, Sarajevo, 2017, 50–56.
- Liberalizam prije liberalizma?. Sveske za javno pravo 18, Sarajevo, 2014, 91–96.
- Bosanski muslimani i (post)modernost. Bosna franciscana 40, Sarajevo, 2014, 61–84.
- Ustav BiH između pravne znanosti i političke moći. Bosna i Hercegovina, europska zemlja bez ustava — znanstveni, etički i politički izazov, Franjevački institut za kulturu mira/Synopsis, Zagreb-Sarajevo, 2013, 164–170. Bosna franciscana 40, Sarajevo, 2014, 61–84.
- Od kantovskog projekta do hegelovskog ostvarenja. Ujedinjenje Evrope kroz lukavstvo uma?. Sveske za javno pravo 10, Sarajevo, 2012, 84–87.
- Treći ideal. Filozofska istraživanja 112, Zagreb, 2011, ss. 407–416.
- Nepristranost: fikcija kao ideal. Pravni zapisi, br. 2, Belgrade, 2010, 460–471.
- Muke s liberalizmom II. Status, no. 15, Mostar, 2011, 266–275.
- Muke s liberalizmom I. Status, no. 13, Mostar, 2008, 222–230.
- Granice etnokulturne pravde. Helsinška povelja, Belgrade, no. 53, 2002, 54–55.
- Les identités individuelles, les identités collectives : nouvelles interrogations. Europe contre Europe L’Union européenne au défi des identités nationales et religieuses de l’Europe orientale. Quorum: Pariz, 1999.
- Les Musulmans bosniaques entre l’ethnos et la démocratie. Islam et changement social. Lausanne: Éditions Payot, 1998.
- Gefahren und Chancen der bevorstehenden Wahlen in Bosnien-Herzegowina. Fluchtlinge, Verfassungsrecht und Menschenrechte. Berlin: ZDWF, 1997.
- Is the war in former Yugoslavia a war of minorities?. Via Europa, London, January 1996.
- De vrais faux problèmes. Confluences Méditerranée, n° 13, Winter 1994–1995.
- Bosnie: les partis dans la guerre. Diagonales Est-Ouest, n° 18, February 1994.
- Die “bosnische Frage” — eine europäische Frage. In Alida BREMER (dir.) Jugoslawische (Sch)erben. Probleme und Perspektiven. Münster: Fibre Verlag, 1993.
- Le funeste plan de paix pour la Bosnie. Libération, 20 October 1993.
- La “question bosniaque” en tant que problème européen. Lignes, n° 20, Pariz: Éditions Hazan, September 1993.
- The cruelest Unity: A Bosnian Norm for European Rights. War Report, June–July 1993.
- Država, nacija, suverenost. Nedjelja, n° 19 (1 July 1990) and n° 20 (8 July 1990).
- Prokrustova postelja dogmatskog marksizma. Uz studiju dra Miroljuba Jevtića Savremeni džihad kao rat. Kulturni radnik, n° 3, Zagreb, 1989.
- Dijalektika pseudokonkretnog. Politološka analiza kosovskih zbivanja. Oslobođenje/Nedjelja, 21 August 1988.
- Ketman. Jedno čitanje Zarobljenog uma Czeslawa Milosza. Oslobođenje/Nedjelja, 5 June 1988.
- La terminologie philosophique arabe. Prolégomènes. Synthesis Philosophica n° 3, Zagreb, 1987.
