= Jošavka Gornja =

- Village
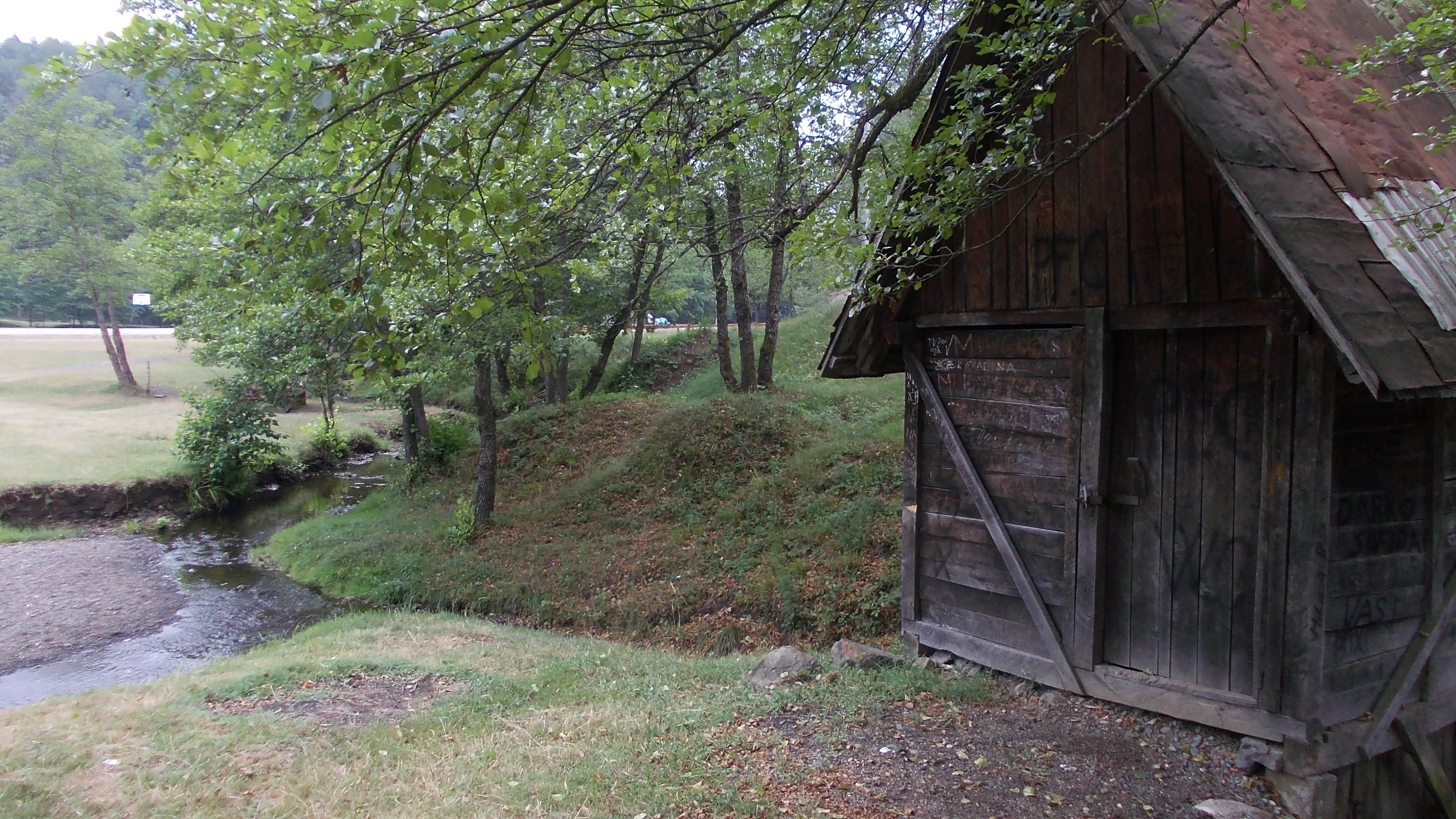

- Location within Republika Srpska Location within Bosnia and Herzegovina
- Coordinates: 44°43′N 17°28′E
- Country: Bosnia and Herzegovina
- Entity: Republika Srpska
- Municipality: Čelinac
- Time zone: UTC+1 (CET)
  - Summer (DST): UTC+2 (CEST)

Jošavka Gornja (Cyrillic: Јошавка Горња) is a village in the municipality of Čelinac, Republika Srpska, Bosnia and Herzegovina.

== Population ==
Jošavka Gornja Census Year 2013: Total of 472 inhabitants
Census Year	1991	1981	1971
Serbs	557 (98,93%)	2 208 (91,89%)	2 403 (99,13%)
Croats	–	4 (0,166%)	3 (0,124%)
Bosniaks	–	1 (0,042%)	–
Albanians	–	–	1 (0,041%)
Yugoslavians	3 (0,533%)	164 (6,825%)	–
Ostali	3 (0,533%)	26 (1,082%)	17 (0,701%)
Total	563	2 403	2 424

- In the Census Years of 1981 and 1971 Jošavka Donja and Jošavka Gornja were the unique settlement.
