= Sreten Stojanović =

Serbian sculptor and art critic (1898–1960)

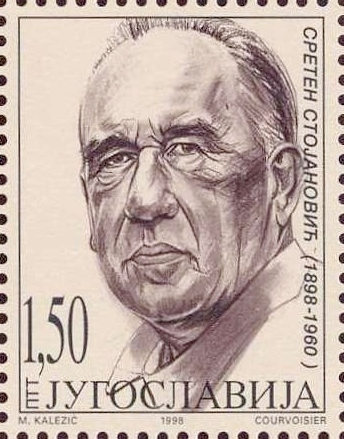
- Born: Sreten Stojanović; 2 February 1898; Prijedor, Austria-Hungary
- Died: 29 October 1960 (aged 62); Belgrade, FPR Yugoslavia
- Education: Vienna, Paris
- Known for: Sculpture

Sreten Stojanović (Serbian Cyrillic: Сретен Стојановић; 2 February 1898 – 29 October 1960) was a Serbian sculptor, university professor and art critic. His artistic individuality was best observed in portraits made of various materials.

== Biography ==
He was born on 15 February 1898 in Prijedor in Bosnia and Herzegovina, in a house of Orthodox priests.

As a young man, he belonged to the Young Bosnia Movement where he was, as a juvenile pupil of the Tuzla's high school, sentenced to 10 years in prison. He was also shortly engaged adventurously in national interests at the end of the First World War. In the beginning of 1918 he went to Vienna to study sculpture and at the beginning of the 1920s he enjoyed a turbulent bohemian life in Paris, where he also devoted himself to study.

He received his scholarships from dr. Djurica Djordjević and his wife Krista, who he became acquainted and afterward became friends with. They were big defenders of the modern art in between-the-wars Yugoslavia and their house became one of the most known meeting places of artists, writers, young left-wing politicians and intellectuals. He indulged in Viennese revolutionary movements before the black-yellow monarchy's downfall. Being in the midst of social happenings, he returned to Bosnia immediately after the end of the war where he was engaged in creation of first Yugoslavia, with all his achieved political and penal reputation, belligerence and revolutionary mood. He commanded the committee and irregular troops which established order in a condition of a total anarchy, just before arrival of the regular Alexander the Great's liberation army which was arriving in its epochal Thessaloniki inrush. With Dragiša Vasić and Vladislav Ribnikar he traveled through the Soviet Union in 1927.

During the Second World War he lived in Belgrade with his family and when the war was over he found out that his brother, Dr. Mladen Stojanović, died. His brother was a legendary national hero and one of the key persons of Josip Broz Tito's partisan movement in western Bosnia. After his brother's death, Stojanović engaged himself in many functions. He was the chairman of the National Front in Belgrade, commoner, the secretary of the Association of Painters of Yugoslavia, the chairman of the Association of Painters of Serbia, the principal of the Art Academy, the editor of the magazine "Art", and a member of Serbian Academy of Art and Sciences in 1950.

He died in Belgrade in 1960, leaving behind one of the most valuable sculpture opuses in the Serbian art of the 20th century. For his birthplace Prijedor he gave a gift of an important part of his artworks. His creations can also be seen in the gallery Pavlo Beljanski in Novi Sad, the National museum and the Museum of modern art in Belgrade. In memorial buildings in Belgrade, Vojvodina, Montenegro and Republic of Srpska in Bosnia-Herzegovina there are some of his most important monumental compositions.

== Bibliography ==
- Stojanović, Sreten (1928). Impresije iz Rusije (in Serbian). -{YU}--Belgrade: Novosti. pp. 79 pages.
- Stojanović, Sreten (1952). O umetnosti i umetnicima (in Serbian). -{YU}--Belgrade: Prosveta. pp. 103 pages.
- Stojanović, Sreten. Biste (in Serbian). -{YU}--Belgrade.

== Gallery ==
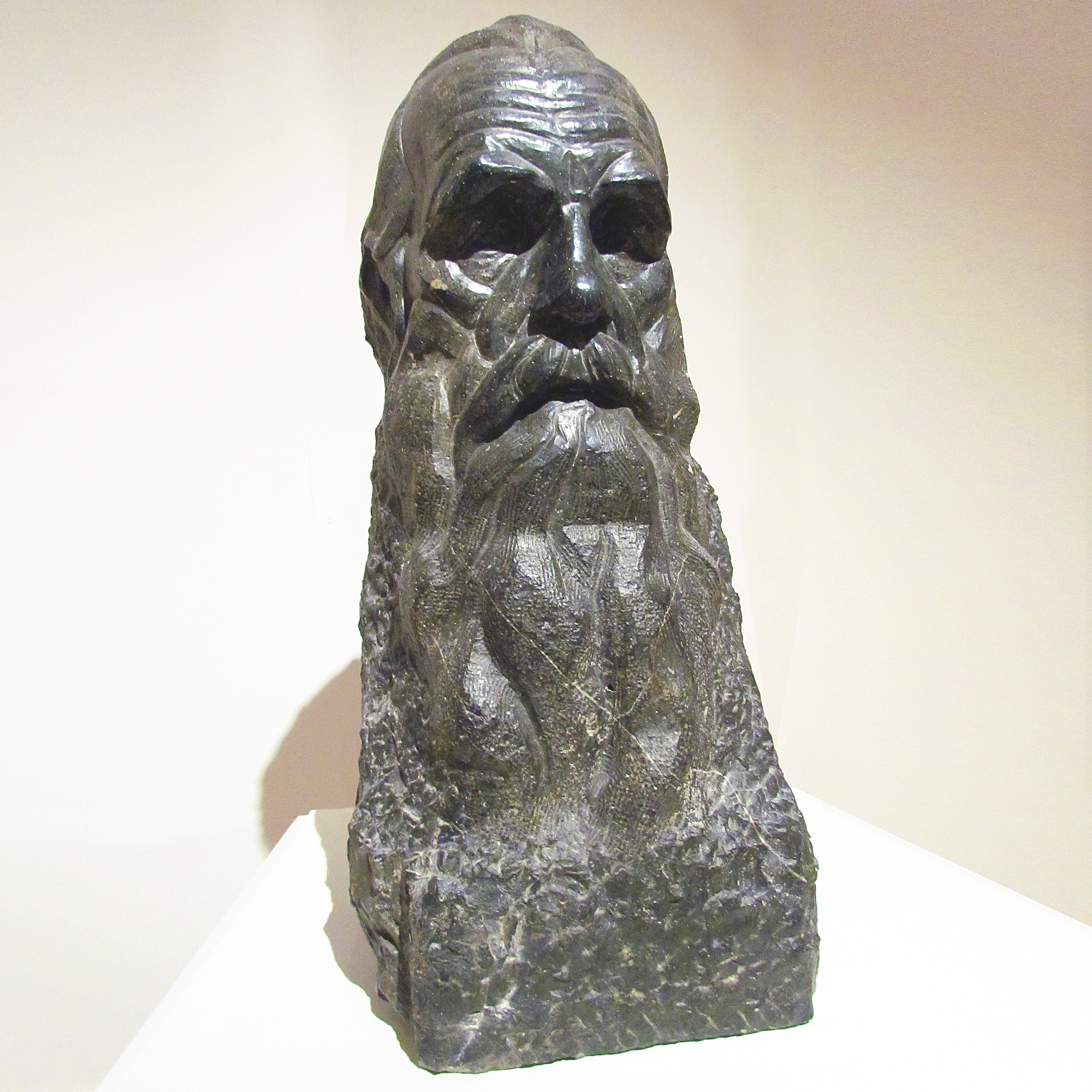
My father (1919)

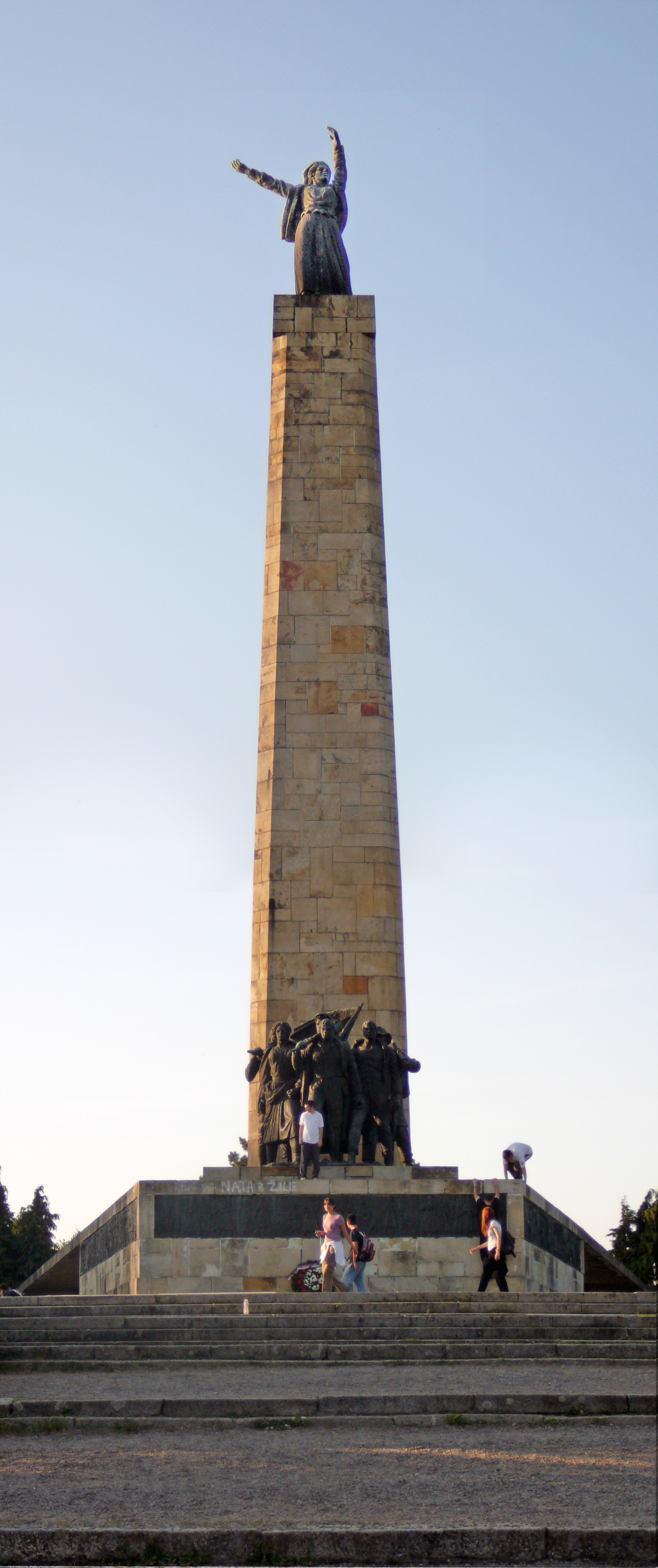
Sloboda monument at Fruška Gora (1951)

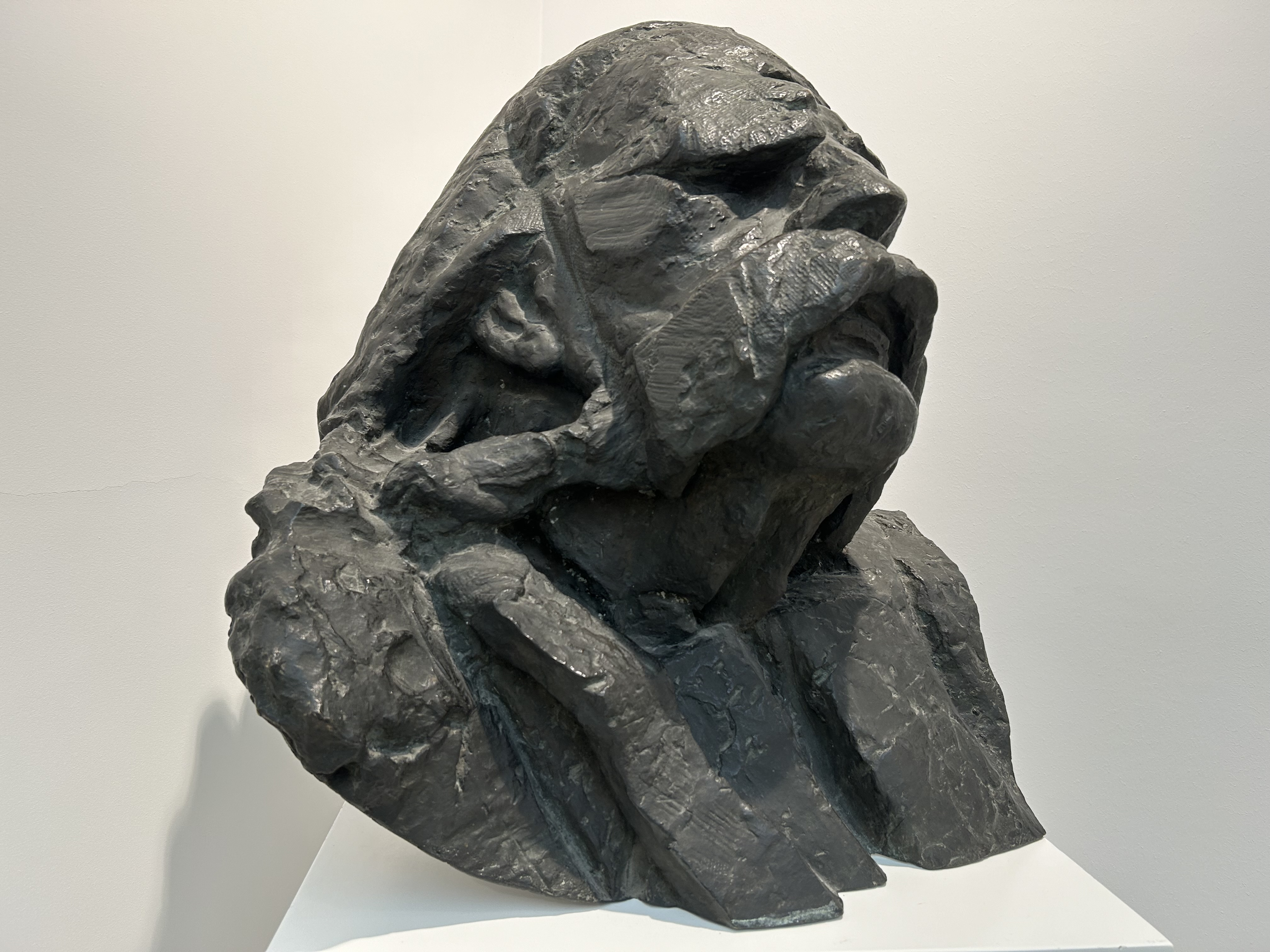
Guslar, Pavle Beljanski Memorial Collection (1956)

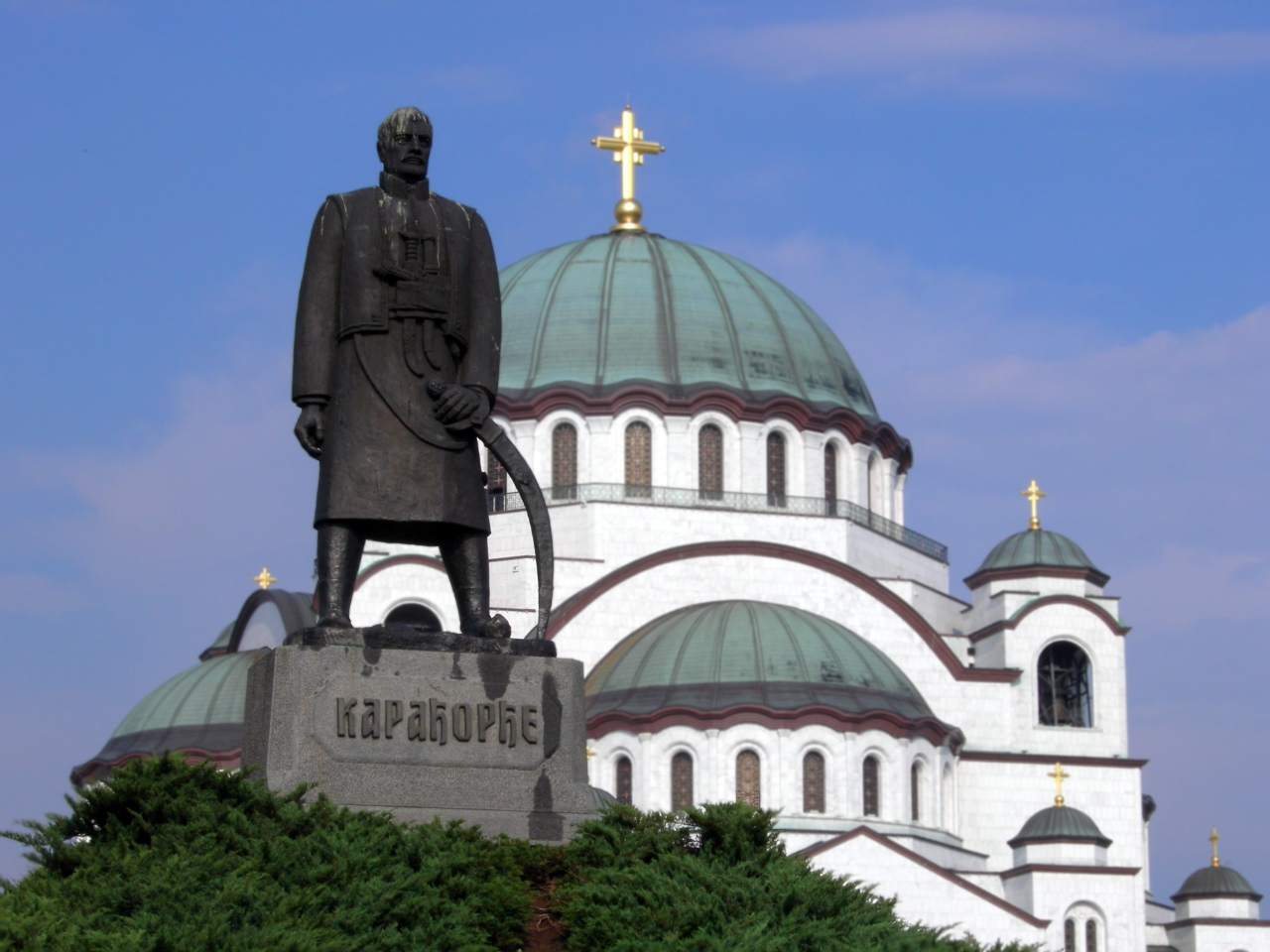
Monument to Karađorđe Petrović

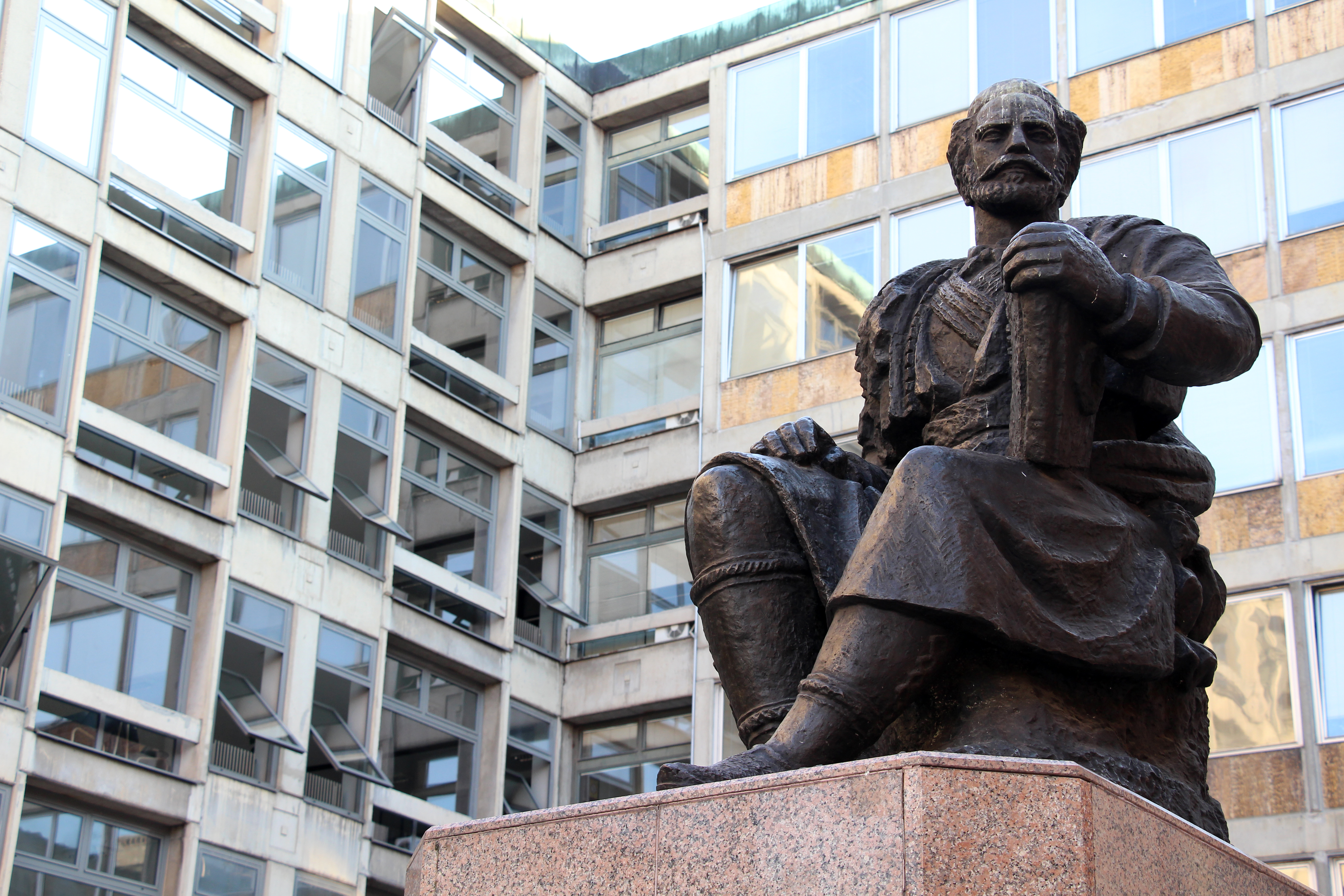
Monument to Petar II Petrović-Njegoš

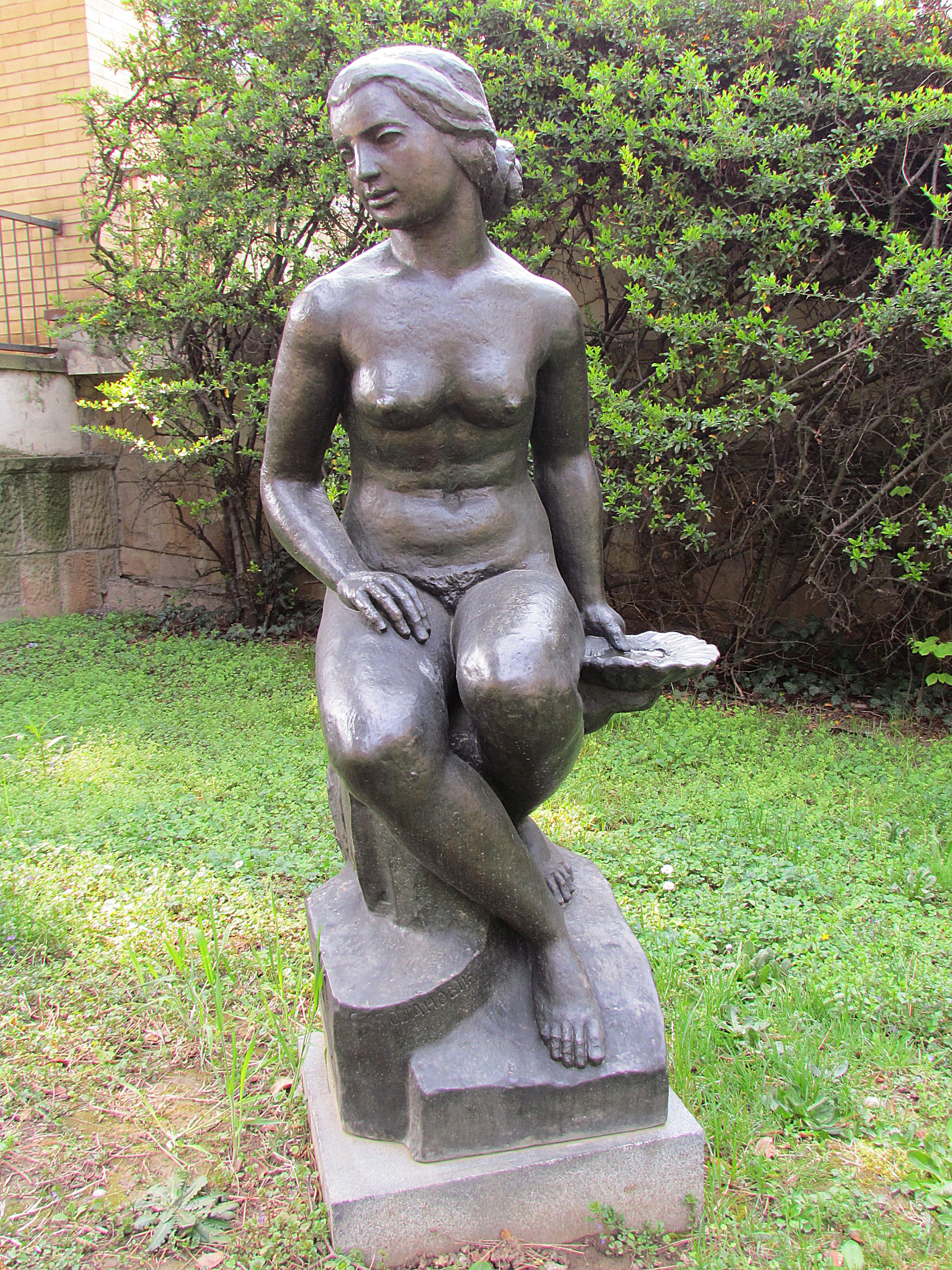
Fontana, Museum of Yugoslavia

== See also ==
- Živojin Lukić
- Rastko Petrović
- Prince Bojidar Karageorgevich
