= World War II in Yugoslavia =

- Part of the Mediterranean and European theatres of World War II
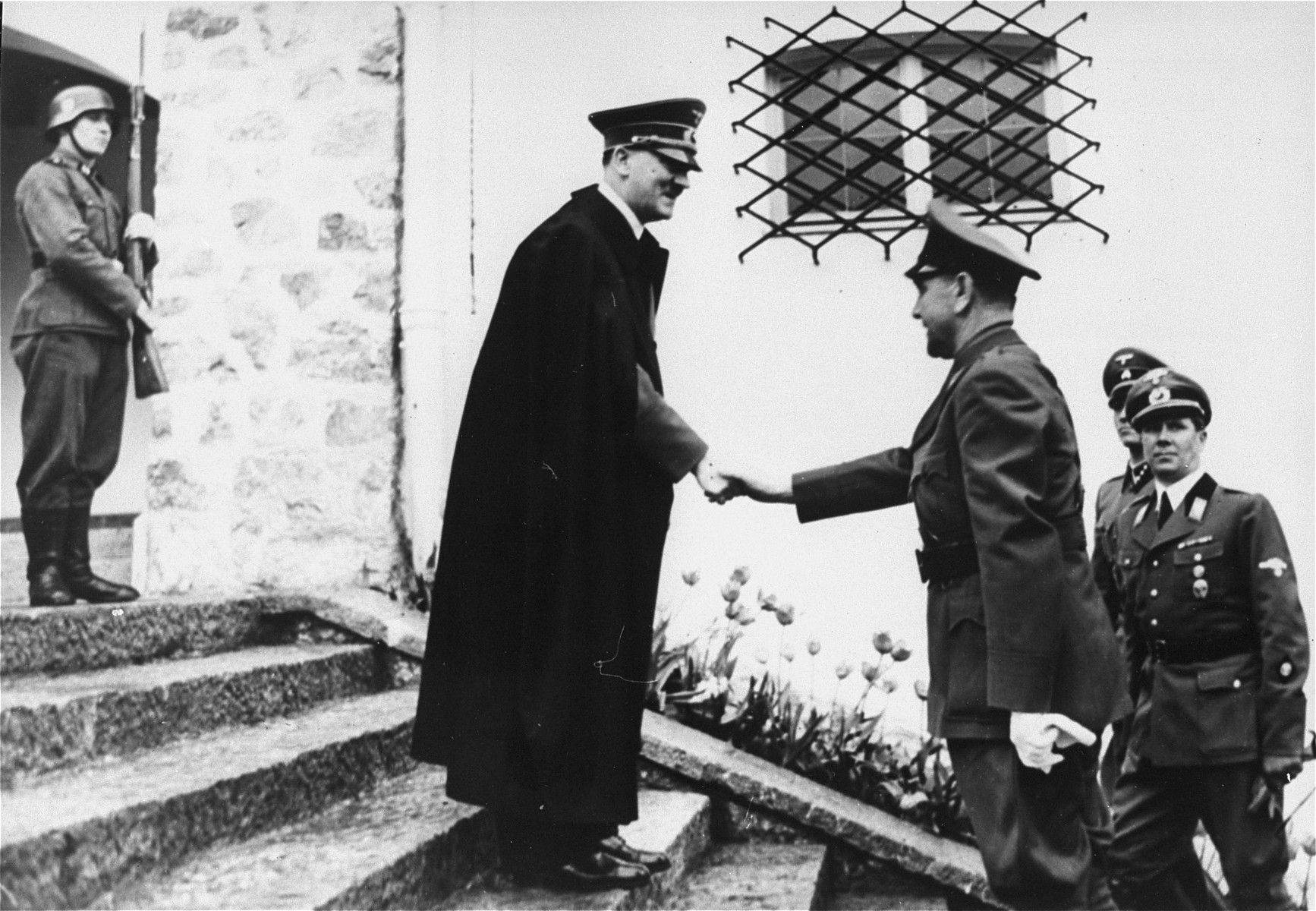
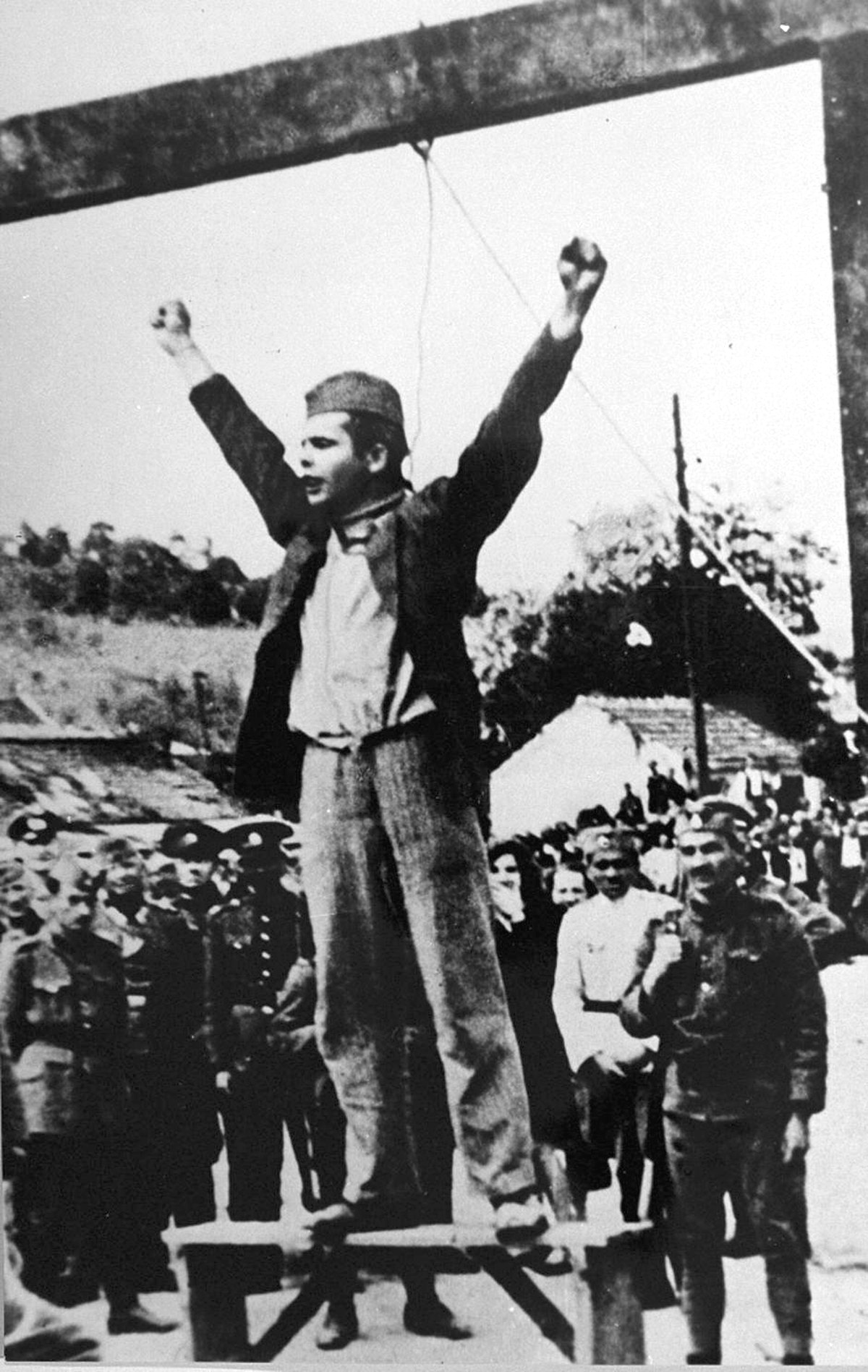
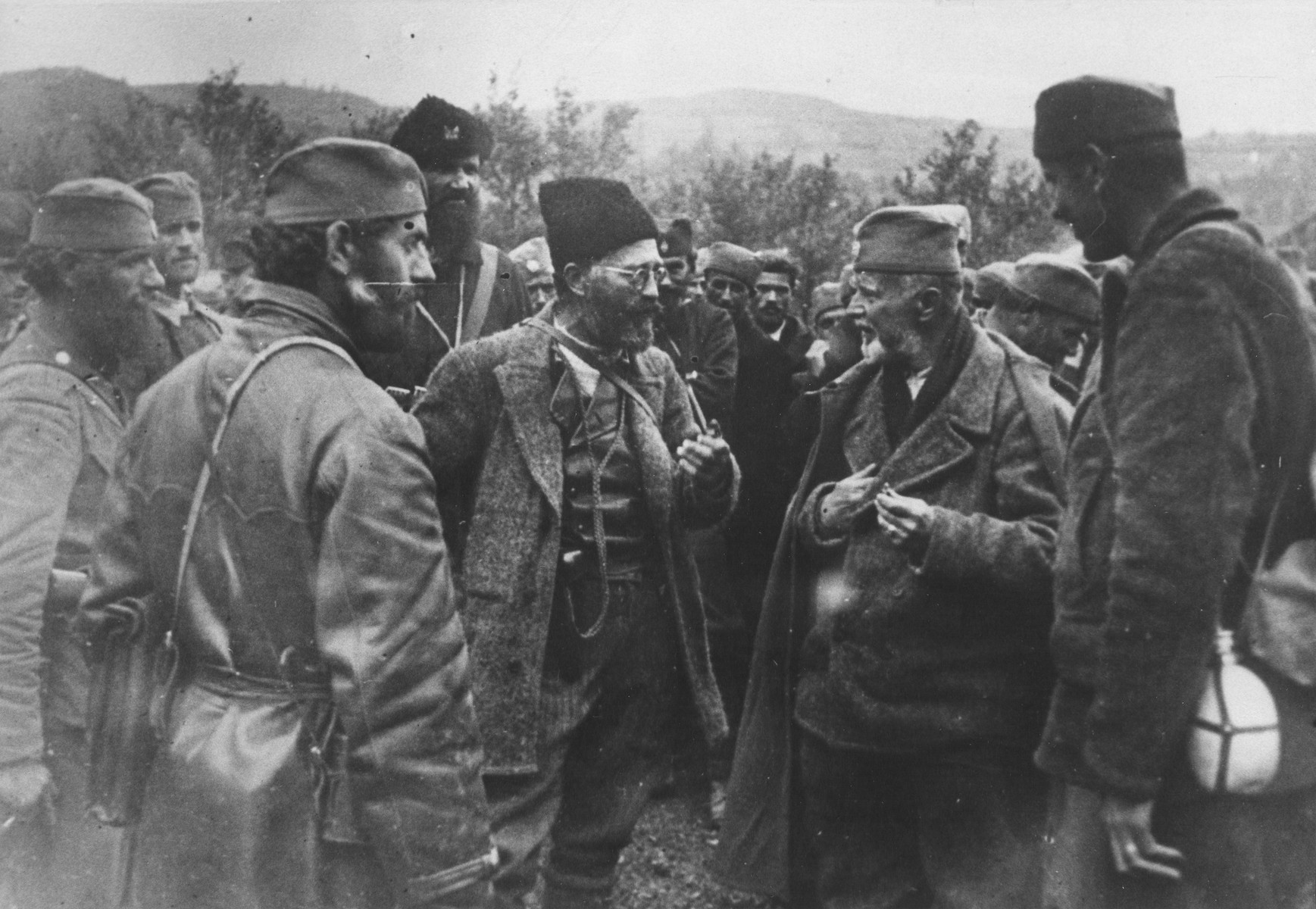
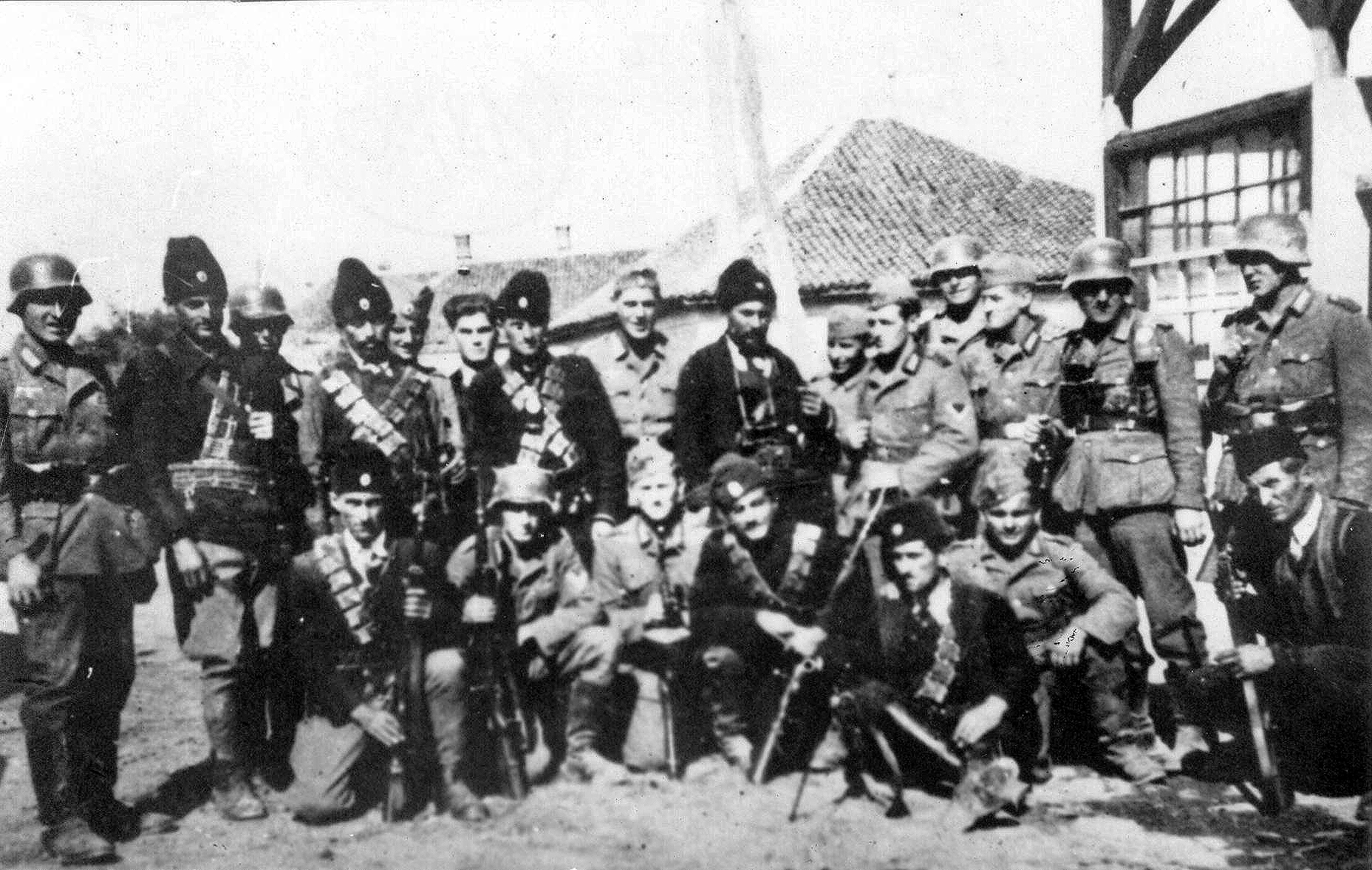
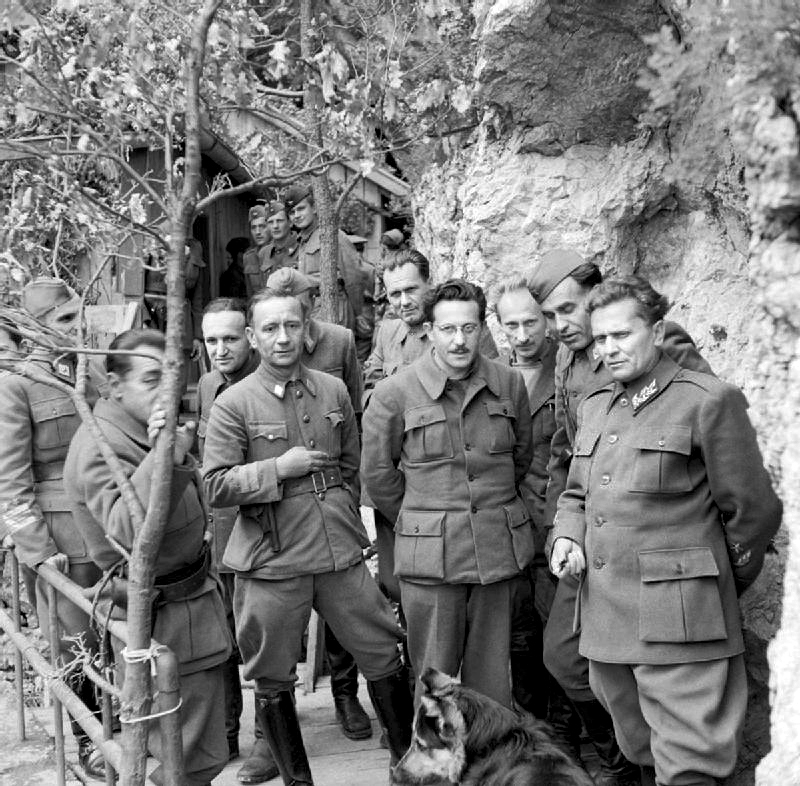
- Clockwise from top left: Ante Pavelić visits Adolf Hitler at the Berghof; Stjepan Filipović shouted Smrt fašizmu, sloboda narodu! ("Death to fascism, freedom to the people!") before hanged by the occupation forces; Draža Mihailović confers with his troops; A group of Chetniks with German soldiers in a village in Serbia; Josip Broz Tito with members of the British mission.
Date	6 April 1941 – 25 May 1945 (4 years, 1 month, 1 week and 2 days)
Location	Yugoslavia
Result	Yugoslav Partisan–Allied victory

Belligerents
April 1941: Germany; Italy; Hungary	April 1941: Yugoslavia	
1941 – September 1943: Germany; Government of National Salvation^{[a]}; Pećanac Chetniks; (Russia) Russian Protective Corps; Italy; Montenegro^{[b]}; Albania^{[b]}; Hungary; Bulgaria; Independent State of Croatia^{[c]}	1941–43: Chetniks^{[d]}; Support: (Kingdom of Yugoslavia) Yugoslav government-in-exile; United Kingdom; United States	1941–43: Yugoslav Partisans; Support: Soviet Union
September 1943–1945: Germany; Government of National Salvation (until 1944); (Government of National Salvation) Serbian Volunteer Corps; Serbian State Guard; Montenegro (until 1944); Albania (until 1944); Slovene Home Guard; Montenegrin Volunteer Corps (from 1944); (Hellenic State (1941–1944)) Security Battalions (from 1944); Bulgaria (until 1944); Hungary (until 1944); Szálasi government (after 1944)^{[c]}; Independent State of Croatia; Montenegrin National Army (1945); Italian Social Republic^{[c]}; Chetniks; Balli Kombëtar; Russian Liberation Army (from 1944); (Russia) Russian Protective Corps	1943–45: DF Yugoslavia; Yugoslav Partisans; Soviet Union; United Kingdom; United States; Italian partisans; Italy; Bulgaria (1944–45); LANÇ (1944–45); Yugoslav government-in-exile (1944–45)	

Strength
(Nazi Germany) 300,000 (1944) (Fascist Italy) 321,000 (1943) (Independent State of Croatia) 170,000 (1943); 130,000 (1945) (Tsardom of Bulgaria (1908–1946)) 70,000 (1943) (Government of National Salvation) 60,000 (1944); 12,000 (1944)	(Kingdom of Yugoslavia) 700,000 (1941) (400,000 ill-prepared) (Chetniks) 93,000 (1943)	(Yugoslav Partisans) 100,000 (1943); 800,000 (1945) (Soviet Union) (Tsardom of Bulgaria (1908–1946)) 580,000 (1944); 40,000 (1943)

Casualties and losses
(Nazi Germany) Germany:^{[e]} 19,235–103,693 killed 14,805 missing (Fascist Italy) Italy:^{[f]} 9,065 killed 15,160 wounded 6,306 missing Independent State of Croatia: 99,000 killed	(Yugoslav Partisans) Partisans: 245,549 killed 399,880 wounded 31,200 died from wounds 28,925 missing Soviet Union: 7,995 irrecoverable losses (6,307 killed, died from wounds or died of disease); 21,589 other casualties	
- Civilians killed: ≈514,000–581,000 Total Yugoslav casualties: ≈850,000–1,200,000^{a} Collaborationist government in German-occupied Serbia^{b} Italian military occupation administration in Yugoslav territory^{c} Axis puppet state^{d} Initially a resistance movement; engaged in collaboration with Axis forces from mid-1942 onward and lost official Allied support in 1943. Full names: initially "Chetnik Detachments of the Yugoslav Army", then "Yugoslav Army in the Fatherland".^{e} Casualties in the Balkan area, including Greece, from April 1941 to January 1945.^{f} Including casualties in the April invasion of Yugoslavia

World War II in the Kingdom of Yugoslavia began on 6 April 1941, when the country was invaded and swiftly conquered by Axis forces and partitioned among Germany, Italy, Hungary, Bulgaria and their client regimes. Shortly after Germany attacked the USSR on 22 June 1941, the Comintern issued directives to all communist parties to come to the Soviet Union's aid, following which the communist-led Yugoslav Partisans launched a guerrilla liberation war fighting against the Axis forces and their locally established puppet regimes, including the Axis-allied Independent State of Croatia (NDH) and the Government of National Salvation in the German-occupied territory of Serbia. This was dubbed the National Liberation War and Socialist Revolution in post-war Yugoslav communist historiography. Simultaneously, a multi-side civil war was waged between the Yugoslav communist Partisans, the Serbian royalist Chetniks, the Axis-allied Croatian Ustaše and Home Guard, Serbian Volunteer Corps and State Guard, Slovene Home Guard, as well as Nazi-allied Russian Protective Corps troops.

Both the Yugoslav Partisans and the Chetnik movement initially resisted the Axis invasion. However, after 1941, Chetniks extensively and systematically collaborated with the Italian occupation forces until the Italian capitulation, and thereon also with German and Ustaše forces. The Axis mounted a series of offensives intended to destroy the Partisans, coming close to doing so in the Battles of Neretva and Sutjeska in the spring and summer of 1943.

Despite the setbacks, the Partisans remained a credible fighting force, with their organisation gaining recognition from the Western Allies at the Tehran Conference and laying the foundations for the post-war Yugoslav socialist state. With support in logistics and air power from the Western Allies, and Soviet ground troops in the Belgrade offensive, the Partisans eventually gained control of the entire country and of the border regions of Trieste and Carinthia. The victorious Partisans established the Federal People's Republic of Yugoslavia.

The conflict in Yugoslavia had one of the highest death tolls by population in the war, and is usually estimated at around one million, about half of whom were civilians. Genocide and ethnic cleansing was carried out by the Axis forces (particularly the Wehrmacht) and their collaborators (particularly the Ustaše and Chetniks), and reprisal actions from the Partisans became more frequent towards the end of the war, and continued after it.

== Background ==
Prior to the outbreak of war, the government of Milan Stojadinović (1935–1939) tried to navigate between the Axis powers and the imperial powers by seeking neutral status, signing a non-aggression treaty with Italy and extending its treaty of friendship with France. At the same time, the country was destabilized by internal tensions, as Croatian leaders demanded a greater level of autonomy. Stojadinović was sacked by the regent Prince Paul in 1939 and replaced by Dragiša Cvetković, who negotiated a compromise with Croatian leader Vladko Maček in 1939, resulting in the formation of the Banovina of Croatia.

However, rather than reducing tensions, the agreement only reinforced the crisis in the country's governance. Groups from both sides of the political spectrum were not satisfied: the pro-fascist Ustaše sought an independent Croatia allied with the Axis; Serbian public and military circles preferred alliance with Britain and France, while the then-banned Communist Party of Yugoslavia saw the Soviet Union as a natural ally.

Following the fall of France in June 1940, Yugoslavia's Regent Prince Paul and his government saw no way of saving the Kingdom of Yugoslavia except through accommodation with the Axis powers. Although Germany's Adolf Hitler was not particularly interested in creating another front in the Balkans, and Yugoslavia itself remained at peace during the first year of the war, Benito Mussolini's Italy had invaded Albania in April 1939 and launched the rather unsuccessful Italo-Greek War in October 1940. These events resulted in Yugoslavia's geographical isolation from potential Allied support. The government tried to negotiate with the Axis on cooperation with as few concessions as possible, while attempting secret negotiations with the Allies and the Soviet Union, but these moves failed to keep the country out of the war. A secret mission to the U.S., led by the influential Serbian-Jewish Captain David Albala, with the purpose of obtaining funding to buy arms for the expected invasion went nowhere, while the Soviet Union's Joseph Stalin expelled Yugoslav ambassador Milan Gavrilović just one month after agreeing a treaty of friendship with Yugoslavia (prior to 22 June 1941, Nazi Germany and Soviet Russia adhered to the non-aggression pact the parties had signed in August 1939 and in the autumn 1940, Germany and the Soviet Union had been in talks on the USSR's potential accession to the Tripartite Pact).

== 1941 ==
Under sustained German pressure and following failed attempts to maintain neutrality, Yugoslavia signed the Tripartite Pact on 25 March 1941 in the Vienna Belvedere. The following day, protests broke out in Belgrade against the accession. On 27 March 1941, Air Force general Borivoje Mirković led a group of Serbian Air Force officers in overthrowing the Cvetković government in a military coup. Hitler decided to postpone his invasion of the Soviet Union and demolish the Yugoslav state permanently.

=== Axis invasion and dismemberment of Yugoslavia ===
Map of the Axis occupation of Yugoslavia

==== The April War ====
On 6 April 1941, following Hitler's Directive No. 25 ordering the military destruction and political dismemberment of Yugoslavia, Germany, Italy, and Hungary invaded the Kingdom of Yugoslavia. Belgrade was bombed by the German Luftwaffe on the same day. The conflict, known as the April War, lasted eleven days, ending with the unconditional surrender signed by General Danilo Kalafatović on 17 April on behalf of the Yugoslav government and army. Approximately 344,000 Yugoslav officers and troops were taken prisoner, roughly half the armed forces. After most Croats and Macedonians were released, between 200,000 and 300,000, mostly Serbs, were transferred to camps in Germany and Italy. A further 300,000, again largely Serbs, escaped capture by disregarding the capitulation order. The early withdrawal of crack German units from Yugoslavia in late April, necessitated by preparations for Operation Barbarossa, prevented the Wehrmacht from fully securing the occupied territory. The Royal Yugoslav Army's arsenal fell into German hands, and King Petar II and his government fled first to Greece and subsequently to London where they established a government-in-exile.

The Yugoslav army's resistance was undermined by structural weaknesses in organisation, training, and national cohesion. Mobilisation had been deliberately withheld to avoid provoking Hitler and was not ordered until 3 April. Of roughly 700,000 men under arms, more than 400,000 had fewer than four weeks of training and not one division was at full readiness when the invasion began. The Axis brought 52 divisions: 24 German, 23 Italian, and 5 Hungarian, with 2,200 aircraft; German armoured and motorised formations that were veterans of the Polish, Norwegian and French campaigns led the assault. According to Tomasevich, the insistence of the Yugoslav army on defending all its borders assured its failure from the start.

Resistance resolve among the officer corps and general public was greater among Serbs than elsewhere in the country, with fighting resolution running highest in the period around the March 27 coup; once the bombing and invasion began defeatism spread quickly through the higher ranks of the Serbian-dominated officer corps. Elsewhere in the country resolve was present only to a limited degree, with potential fifth column risks among Ustaše sympathisers, pro-Bulgarian population in Macedonia, Albanians in Kosovo, and the Volksdeutsche minority in Vojvodina. According to Matteo J. Milazzo, German units advancing on Zagreb in the first week of fighting were received favourably by much of the Croatian civilian population. Italian military intelligence reported on 12 April 1941, five days before the Yugoslav surrender, that Croatian and Slovene reservists were abandoning their weapons and returning home, with large units falling apart. Historian Aleksa Djilas acknowledges that while some Croatian units deserted, most Croatian officers remained loyal to the Yugoslav army until 10 April when the NDH was proclaimed. Most senior commanders, convinced that resistance was hopeless, focused on surrender rather than continued defence.

==== Partition and occupation ====
With Yugoslav resistance collapsed, Germany proceeded to partition the country in accordance with overlapping strategic interests: incorporating Slovene territory into the Greater Reich, exploiting Serbia's communication lines and mineral resources, rewarding Italy, Hungary and Bulgaria for their roles in the invasion and establishing an independent Croatian state as a reward for the Ustaše. Germany occupied the largest, northern part of Slovenia while Italy annexed the southern part as the Ljubljana Province and Hungary annexed the northeastern Prekmurje region. Slovene political parties had established a Slovene National Council on the first day of the invasion, but it surrendered to the Italian army on 12 April when Italian forces entered Ljubljana. Following the Yugoslav surrender, Germany occupied Serbia outright and placed it under direct military administration, the only territory in dismembered Yugoslavia under direct German military rule, administered first through a Commissioner Administration and then, from 29 August 1941, through a quisling government headed by General Milan Nedić.

On 10 April 1941, to coincide with the entry of German troops into Zagreb, Slavko Kvaternik proclaimed the Independent State of Croatia (NDH) on behalf of the Ustaše movement, with German assistance. Its territory extended over much of modern Croatia and all of modern Bosnia and Herzegovina. It functioned as an Italo-German quasi-protectorate, a puppet state, ratified under the Treaties of Rome of 18 May. The NDH was divided by a Line of Demarcation into German and Italian zones with German influence steadily growing at Italy's expense. The state owed its creation and continued existence to the two Axis powers.

Italy annexed Kosovo, coastal areas of the Croatian Littoral, large sections of Dalmatia, nearly all of the Adriatic islands, the Bay of Kotor, and gained control over Montenegro. Hungary occupied and subsequently annexed Vojvodina, Baranja, Bačka and Međimurje. The Bulgarian army moved into nearly all of modern North Macedonia and parts of eastern Serbia on 19 April 1941, with Bulgaria formally annexing these territories alongside Greek western Thrace and eastern Macedonia on 14 May. The Yugoslav government-in-exile in London retained recognition from the Allied powers.

=== Occupation forces ===
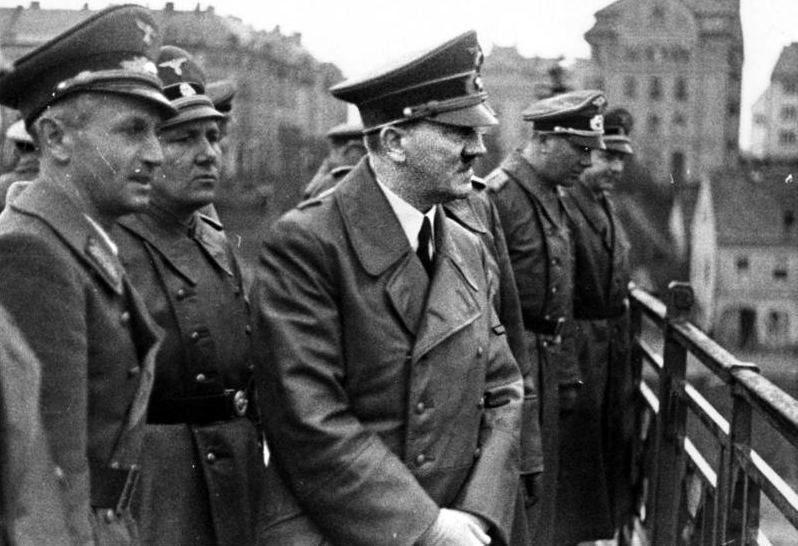
Adolf Hitler in Maribor, Yugoslavia in 1941. He later ordered his officials to "make these lands German again".

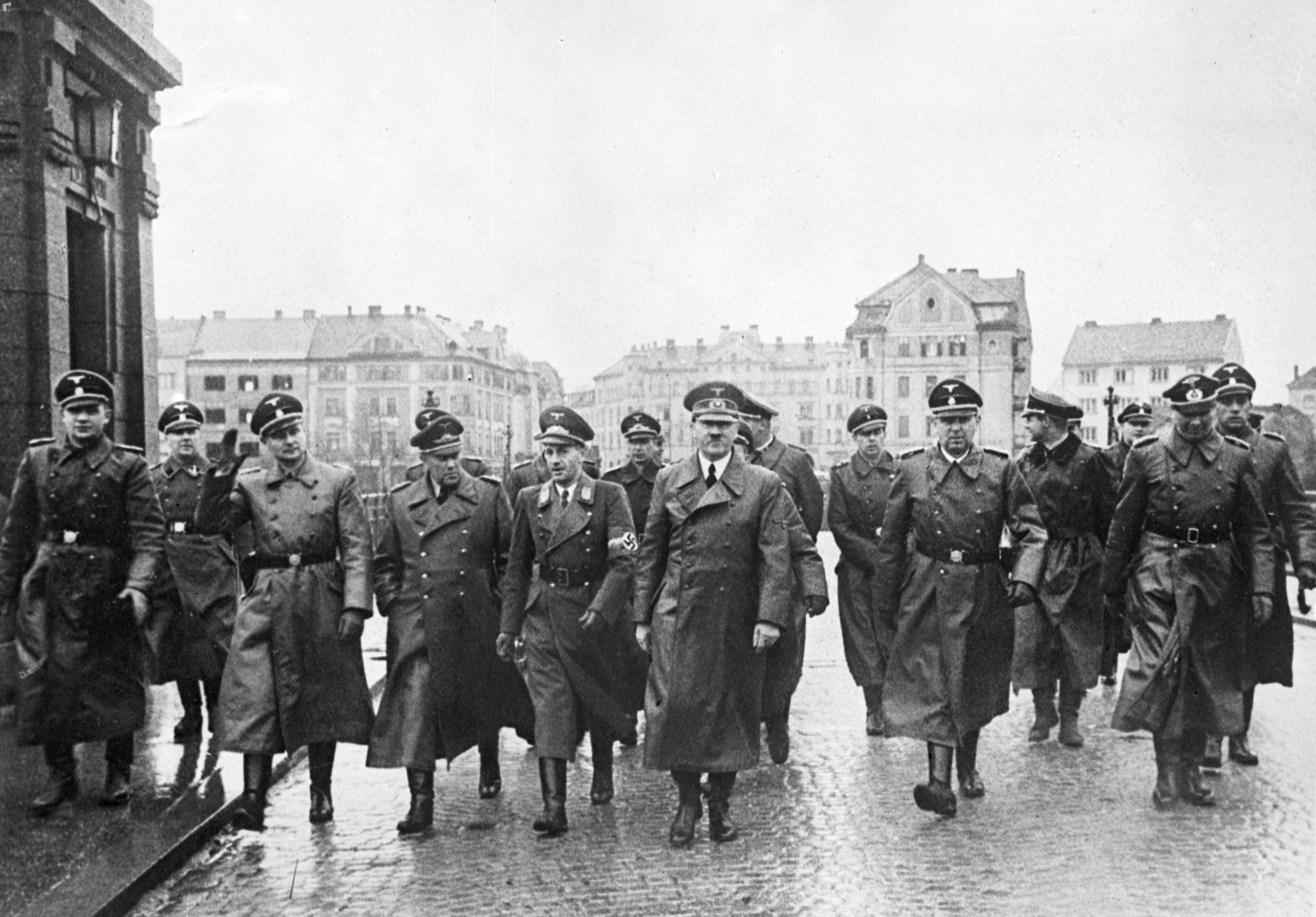
Adolf Hitler walking on the bridge in Maribor, April 1941

The most numerous local force, apart from the four second-line German Wehrmacht infantry divisions assigned to occupation duties, was the Croatian Home Guard (Hrvatsko domobranstvo) founded in April 1941, a few days after the founding of the NDH. The force was formed with the authorisation of German authorities. The task of the new Croatian armed forces was to defend the new state against both foreign and domestic enemies. The Croatian Home Guard was originally limited to 16 infantry battalions and 2 cavalry squadrons – 16,000 men in total. The original 16 battalions were soon enlarged to 15 infantry regiments of two battalions each between May and June 1941, organised into five divisional commands, some 55,000 enlisted men. Support units included 35 light tanks supplied by Italy, 10 artillery battalions (equipped with captured Royal Yugoslav Army weapons of Czech origin), a cavalry regiment in Zagreb and an independent cavalry battalion at Sarajevo. Two independent motorized infantry battalions were based at Zagreb and Sarajevo respectively. Several regiments of Ustaše militia were also formed at this time, which operated under a separate command structure to, and independently from, the Croatian Home Guard, until late 1944. The Home Guard crushed the Serb revolt in Eastern Herzegovina in June 1941, and in July they fought in Eastern and Western Bosnia. They fought in Eastern Herzegovina again, when Croatian-Dalmatian and Slavonian battalions reinforced local units.

The Italian High Command assigned 24 divisions and three coastal brigades to occupation duties in Yugoslavia from 1941. These units were located from Slovenia, Croatia and Dalmatia through to Montenegro and Kosovo.

From April 1941 the Ustasha regime enacted racial laws targeting Serbs, Jews and Roma, barring them from public employment, confiscating their property and compelling them to wear identifying insignia. Throughout the spring and summer of 1941 Ustasha militias swept through the countryside, killing thousands of Serbs in Bosnia and Croatia; as the massacres spread, Serbs fled to the mountains and some began to fight back. In August 1941 construction began on the Jasenovac concentration camp complex on the rivers Una and Sava, the largest of a network of camps established across the NDH. By mid-summer the scale of the killings had driven large parts of the Serb population into armed insurrection, to the extent that German and Italian occupation forces feared the early collapse of the NDH state. The German plenipotentiary in Croatia, Edmund Glaise von Horstenau, observed as early as September 1941 that Ustasha anti-Serbian policies had produced the opposite of what was intended, driving Serbs into armed resistance.

=== Early resistance ===
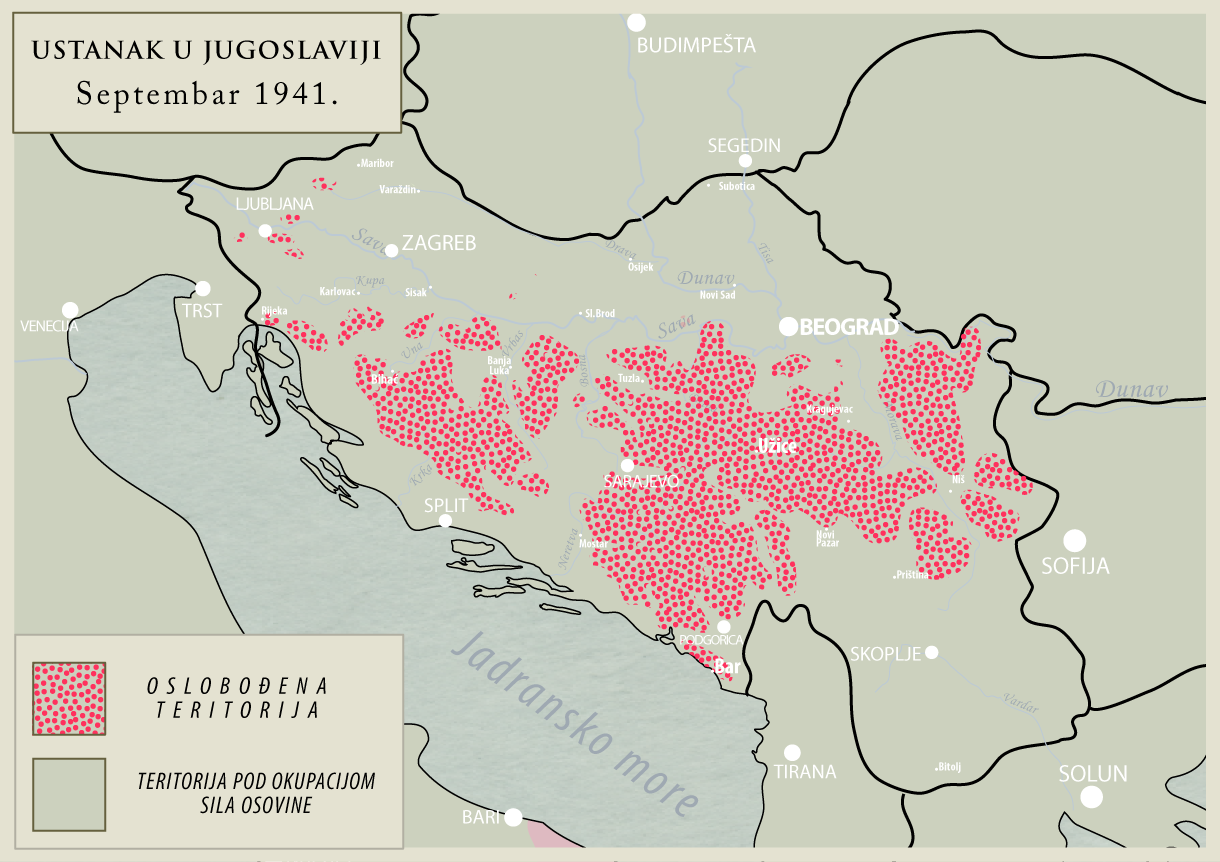
Uprising in Yugoslavia, September 1941

Armed resistance began in July 1941, emerging in all parts of Yugoslavia except Macedonia. The two resistance movements that emerged, the royalist Chetniks and the communist-led Partisans, initially found themselves side by side and collaborated to some extent, though from the outset they held entirely different concepts of resistance. The Partisans, led by the Communist Party of Yugoslavia (CPY) under Josip Broz Tito, were dedicated to a pan-Yugoslav state of free and equal nations, while the Chetniks were a royalist force organised around Colonel Dragoljub Mihailović, almost exclusively composed of Serb officers and men who had refused to surrender. Mihailović's strategy was to build strength and postpone armed confrontation until Allied participation was imminent, whereas Tito, acting on Comintern directives, moved immediately to armed action.

==== Partisan uprising ====
At the outset the Partisan forces were small, poorly armed and without infrastructure, though the Communist Party of Yugoslavia brought some significant assets to the resistance. From the early 1930s, numerous future Yugoslav Partisan leaders were trained in Comintern military schools in the Soviet Union, receiving instruction in guerrilla warfare, sabotage and military tactics. A cadre of Spanish Civil War veterans within the party's ranks provided experience of modern guerrilla warfare, while in Slovenia the movement drew on experienced TIGR members, an antifascist organisation that had been fighting since 1927 for the liberation of the Slovene and Croatian Littoral from fascist Italy. The CPY conducted its resistance as a broad multinational antifascist movement, deliberately setting aside the issue of socialist revolution in favour of national and antifascist liberation appeals, enabling non-Communists to join the movement.

According to Marko Attila Hoare, the Partisan movement was a genuinely multinational movement, though the roles played by the various Yugoslav nationalities were not equivalent; for the first year of its existence the rank-and-file was overwhelmingly Serb, with Serbs comprising approximately 95 per cent of all Partisans in the territory of the NDH by the end of 1941 despite forming only one third of the population. In Slovenia the Liberation Front of the Slovene People was founded in April 1941 as a broad antifascist coalition, later forming the basis for the Slovene Partisans operating as a distinct component of the Yugoslav resistance. In Macedonia, specific local conditions similarly led to the creation of the separate People's Liberation Army of Macedonia.

22 June 1941 marked the start of the Communist Partisan resistance in occupied Yugoslavia. On that day, following Germany's attack on the Soviet Union, the Comintern issued directives to all communist parties to come to the Soviet Union's aid. In Sisak, about fifteen Croatian communists moved into the nearby forest and founded the 1st Sisak Partisan Detachment, the first antifascist partisan detachment formed in Croatia. The detachment began resistance activities the day after its creation, launching sabotage and diversionary attacks on nearby railway lines, destroying telegraph poles, attacking municipal buildings in surrounding villages, seizing arms and ammunition and creating a Communist propaganda network in Sisak and nearby villages.

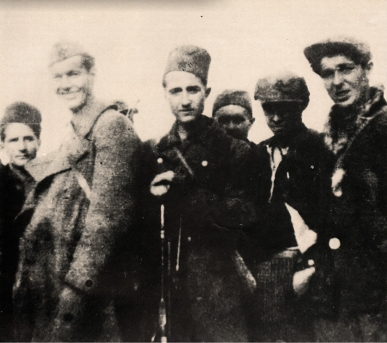
Partisan fighters of the 1st Proletarian Brigade near Rogatica, December 1941

The following day, 23 June, the CPY made its decision to launch an armed uprising in Serbia. On 27 June the Supreme Staff of the National Liberation Partisan Units of Yugoslavia was constituted, to be chaired by Josip Broz Tito. On 4 July a formal order to begin the uprising was issued. On 7 July, fighting broke out in the village of Bela Crkva near Krupanj in western Serbia when quisling gendarmerie attempted to disperse a public meeting, killing two gendarmes; within weeks the uprising had acquired mass proportions across Serbia. On 10 August 1941 the Partisans formed the Kopaonik Detachment at Stanulović, establishing a liberated zone in the surrounding villages known as the "Miners' Republic" that survived until 11 September.

By the end of 1941 Partisan units in Croatia had approximately 7,000 armed combatants, drawing support primarily from Serb villages and to some extent Croat ones. On 22 December 1941 the Partisan Supreme Staff established the 1st Proletarian Brigade at Rudo in East Bosnia, drawn from Serbian and Montenegrin Partisans; Tito framed its establishment as marking the transition from national liberation to social revolution.

==== Chetnik organisation ====
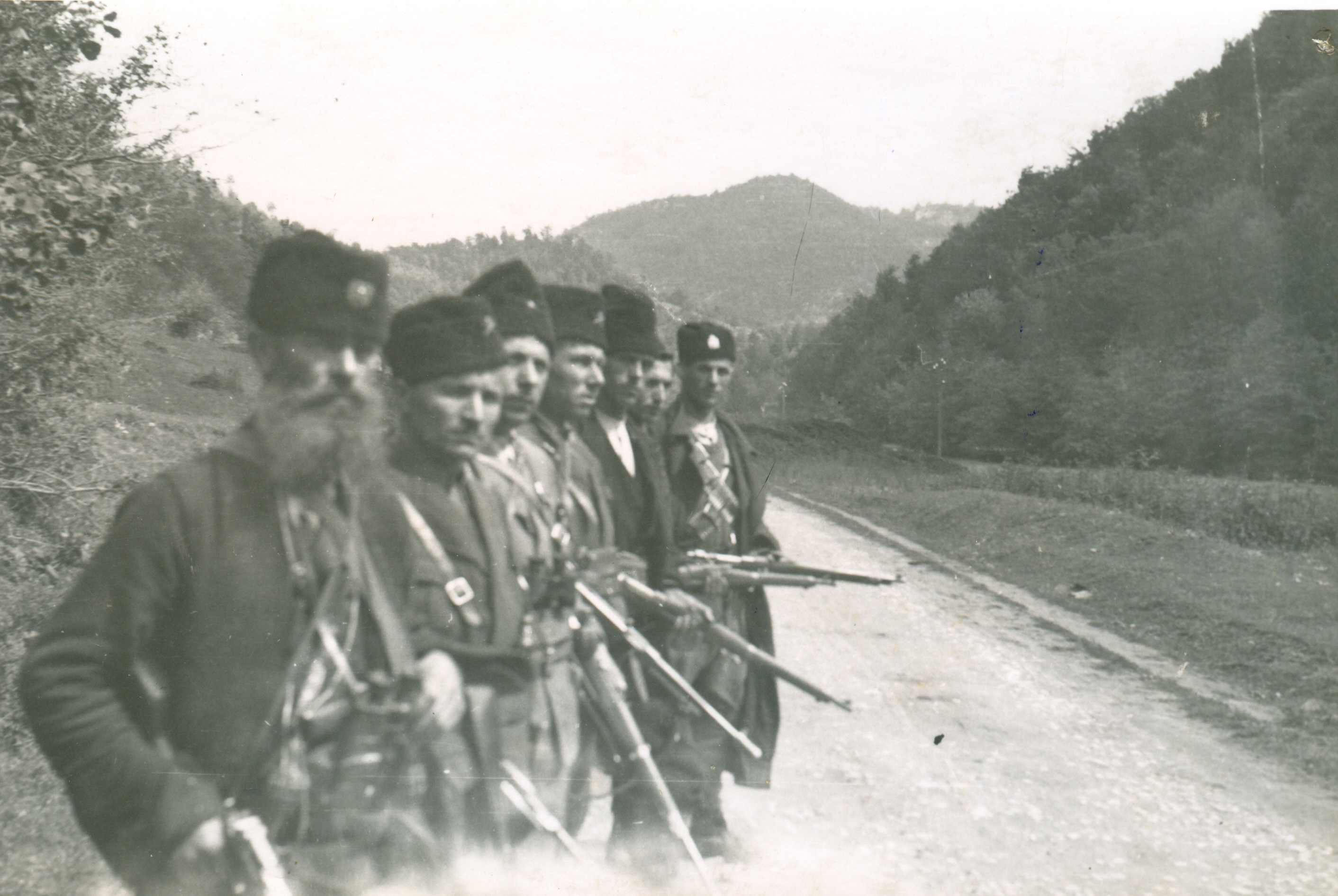
Chetnik fighters, Serbia 1941

The Chetnik resistance force was organised around a small group of Royal Yugoslav Army officers and men, almost exclusively Serbs, who had refused to accept the capitulation. Their leader, Colonel Draža Mihailović, retreated eastward from Doboj in northern Bosnia and on 13 May 1941 reached the highland of Ravna Gora in western Serbia with only seven officers and twenty four NCOs and men. There they established a headquarters designated the Command of Chetnik Detachments of the Yugoslav Army. Through the summer the movement grew as officers made their way from Belgrade to join him; Tomasevich estimated their total strength in the early autumn at no more than three to four thousand men. Mihailović's movement was, however, one of several competing Chetnik formations: Kosta Pećanac, head of the prewar Chetnik Organisation, controlled bands in southern Serbia but had by late June publicly renounced resistance, moving instead toward open collaboration with the occupation authorities.

In August 1941 Mihailović established a Central National Committee drawing on Serbian political and cultural figures to act as a civilian political arm. In September he established contact with the government-in-exile in London and was appointed general and defence secretary.

==== Chetnik–Partisan cooperation and breakdown ====
From August 1941 contacts and cooperation emerged between Chetnik and Partisan detachments in Serbia. By September, Chetnik groups began joining the fighting against the Germans, sometimes in joint operations with the Partisans. On 16 September Hitler issued a directive specifying that one hundred hostages be shot for every German soldier killed and fifty for every soldier wounded. The Partisans had by this point established a liberated zone known as the Republic of Užice, where a captured armaments factory was in full operation. On 19 September Tito and Mihailović met at Struganik near Valjevo; both leaders recognised that their tactical and political differences were irreconcilable, though some minor agreements were reached. In mid-October some 1,700 civilians were shot at Kraljevo and 2,778 men and boys were rounded up and executed at Kragujevac. Mihailović concluded that guerrilla operations of any scale would cost an unsustainable number of Serbian lives and intensified his efforts to disengage from active resistance. By late 1941 some 200,000 Serbian officers and men were prisoners of war in Germany, hundreds of thousands of Serbs were being killed in the NDH and German reprisals in Serbia had cost thousands more lives.

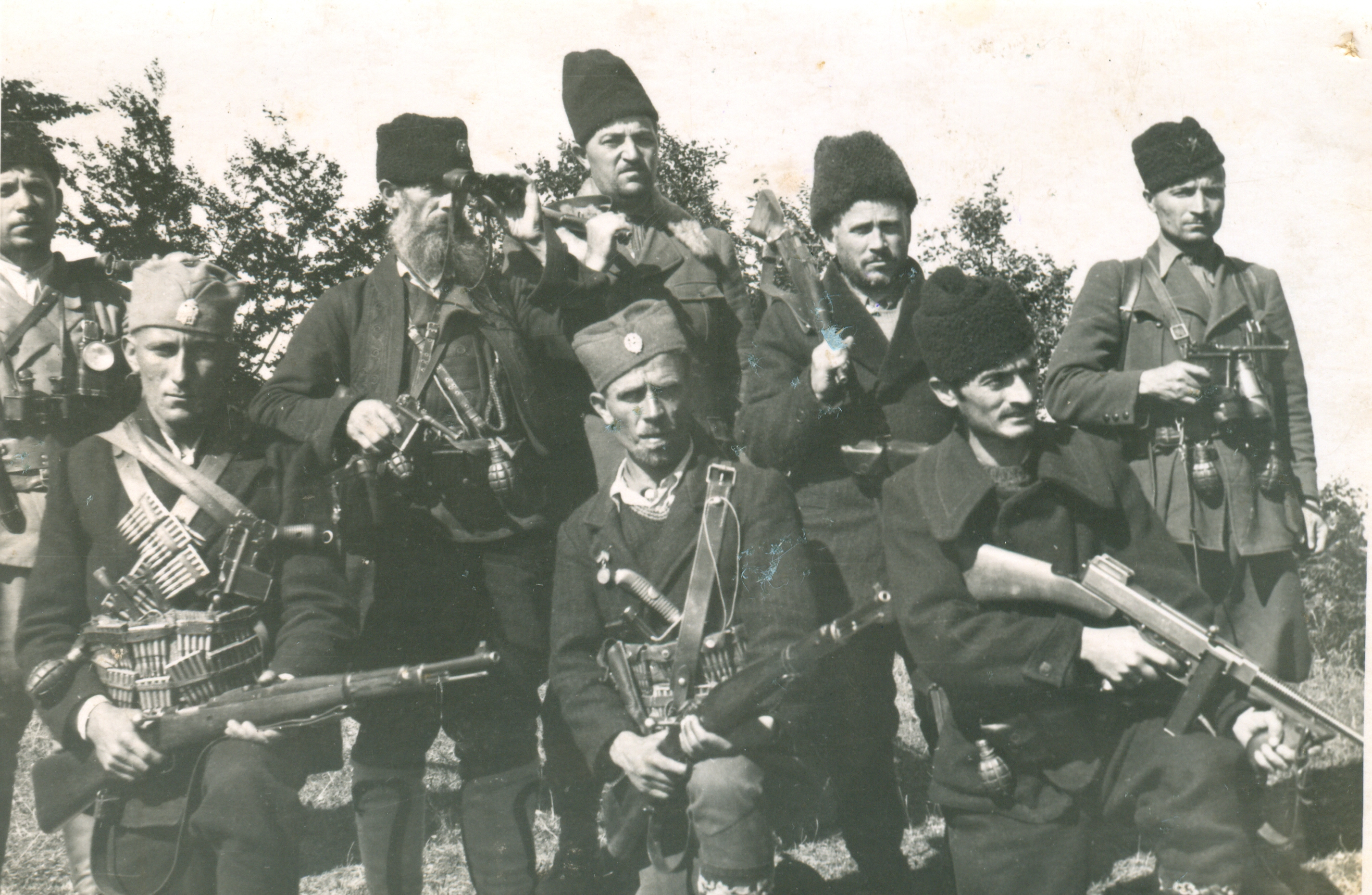
A group of Chetniks and Partisans, Serbia 1941

A second meeting at Brajići on 27 October produced deeper disagreement than Struganik. Each side demanded operational control over the other's forces; neither would accept subordination. Tomasevich argues that the fundamental incompatibility between the two movements went beyond tactics: the Chetniks, backed by the government-in-exile, sought to preserve the pre-war political and social order and concluded that the Partisans had to be destroyed; the Partisans in turn viewed the Chetniks as the central force of counterrevolution and concluded that they equally had to be defeated. Each side identified the other as its primary political enemy. On 1–2 November Chetnik forces attacked the Partisan Supreme Headquarters at Užice; the Partisans had been forewarned and repulsed the attack. Simon Trew notes that responsibility for the assault was never satisfactorily established, with the balance of probability suggesting it resulted from an independent initiative by some of Mihailović's unruly commanders. On 11 November Mihailović met a German delegation at Divci; the Germans demanded his unconditional surrender and rejected his offers of cooperation against the Partisans as insincere. Mihailović refused and the meeting ended without result. Walter Roberts concludes that later charges of German-Chetnik collusion in the expulsion of the Partisans from Serbia are not substantiated by the evidence. The two guerilla movements which had broadly collaborated until October had become bitter enemies. On 15 November the BBC announced that Mihailović was commander of the Yugoslav armed forces in the homeland; Stevan Pavlowitch notes that at that moment his resistance was being inflated to legendary proportions in the Allied world. A joint British-Yugoslav SOE mission, landed by submarine on the Montenegrin coast in late September, reached Mihailović's headquarters in late October; all the mission could do was urge him to husband his resources and attempt to mediate between the two movements.

The first major counter-insurgency operation began on 25 November, with the 113th Infantry and 342nd Infantry Divisions, aided by elements of four further divisions and Serbian collaborationist forces, targeting guerrilla forces in western Serbia. Appeals by Tito to Mihailović on 27 and 28 November to take joint action went unanswered. The Partisans retreated south into the Sandžak and Italian-occupied territory while the Chetniks dispersed into the hills of Ravna Gora. On 3 December orders were issued to destroy Mihailović's detachments; on 6 December the 342nd Infantry Division overran his headquarters at Ravna Gora and he narrowly escaped capture, disbanding most of his forces and going into hiding in the Rudnik Mountain area. By the end of December Bulgaria had assumed responsibility for an occupation zone in eastern Serbia; on 15 January 1942 the Bulgarian 1st Army, with three infantry divisions, formally transferred to south-eastern Serbia and headquartered at Niš, replacing German divisions needed elsewhere. The Partisan setback in Serbia reflected a combination of Axis material superiority, civilian fear of reprisals, the hardship of winter, and the demoralising effect of the civil war with the Chetniks. The Chetniks had been disbanded and the Partisans, driven out, regrouped in eastern Bosnia as a growing resistance force.

== 1942 ==
=== Conflict in eastern Bosnia ===
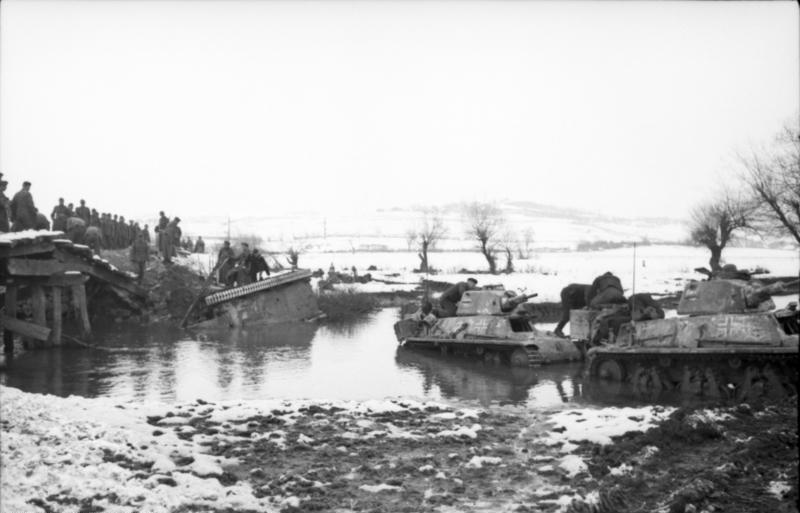
German forces with captured French-made H39 tanks.

At the start of 1942 the two resistance movements remained in open conflict across eastern Bosnia. The Partisans held a foothold in the region but faced significant pressure. Although Chetnik forces dominated much of eastern Bosnia, Italian intelligence recognised that the movement possessed little operational unity: forces under Major Dangić followed the Serbian collaborationist prime minister Nedić rather than Mihailović, while Herzegovinian Chetniks under Jevdević acknowledged Dangić rather than Mihailović directly. The Second Enemy Offensive, comprising German and Croatian operations between January and early February 1942, targeted both insurgent movements; Chetnik commanders Dangić and Todorović advised their units that the offensive was directed only at the Partisans and ordered them to withdraw, letting the Germans pass through their positions and severely weakening the Partisan defence. Despite this the offensive failed to destroy the Partisans, who established a new headquarters at Foča, resumed direct radio contact with the Comintern, and reorganised their movement under a broader national liberation appeal, issuing directives establishing people's committees as the civilian organs of authority in liberated territory.

=== Chetnik–Italian collaboration in Montenegro ===
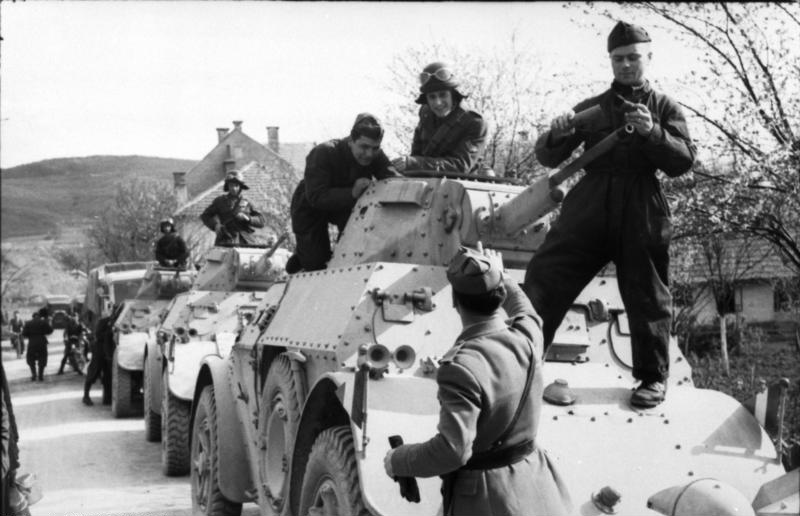
Column of Italian armored reconnaissance cars

In Montenegro, the Partisans suffered a serious setback following their assault on the Italian garrison at Pljevlja in December 1941, which resulted in over 200 dead and widespread desertions. Partisan terror against suspected opponents further alienated the population, and popular support swung sharply against them. In February and March 1942 two local Montenegrin Chetnik commanders, Colonel Stanišić and Captain Djurišić, concluded non-aggression agreements with Italian divisional commands, receiving arms and supplies in exchange for operations against the Partisans; by the end of May they had driven the Partisans out of the greater part of Montenegro. Davide Rodogno argues that the Italians sought above all to secure Chetnik military support against the Partisans, despite being aware that the Chetniks favoured the British and would likely turn their weapons against the Axis should the opportunity arise; the Chetniks for their part collaborated "for reasons of short-term convenience", aware that the Italians' interest in them would end were the Partisans decisively defeated. Mihailović arrived in Montenegro in June 1942 to find these arrangements already in place and local commanders unwilling to subordinate themselves in practice. General Đukanović, the senior commander of all Montenegrin Chetnik forces, then formalised the arrangement in a general agreement with Italian military governor Pirzio Biroli on 24 July 1942. The extent of Mihailović's control over local commanders has been disputed. Tomasevich argues that his principal commanders acted with his backing. Roberts, by contrast, writes that many local agreements were concluded without Mihailović's prior knowledge and that he opposed formal arrangements because they compromised his standing with the Allies. Pavlowitch similarly argues that commanders such as Đurišić recognised Mihailović's authority only insofar as it coincided with their own local interests.

=== The Third Axis Offensive and the Partisan withdrawal to western Bosnia ===
Through the spring of 1942 local Chetnik forces staged coups against the communist leadership of Partisan detachments across eastern Bosnia, severely weakening the Partisan position in the region. In late February German and NDH military leaders meeting in Zagreb agreed to launch a joint offensive against the insurgency, planned as a two-phase operation: an initial offensive in eastern Bosnia, to be followed by a second against the Partisan stronghold around Mount Kozara in Bosnian Krajina. Further planning followed at a conference in Opatija in early March, where German, Italian and NDH representatives agreed to concentrate forces in eastern Bosnia under General Bader and initially resolved to ban any negotiated agreements with either Chetniks or Partisans; the treatment of the Chetniks specifically remained unresolved and was taken up again at a later conference in Ljubljana.

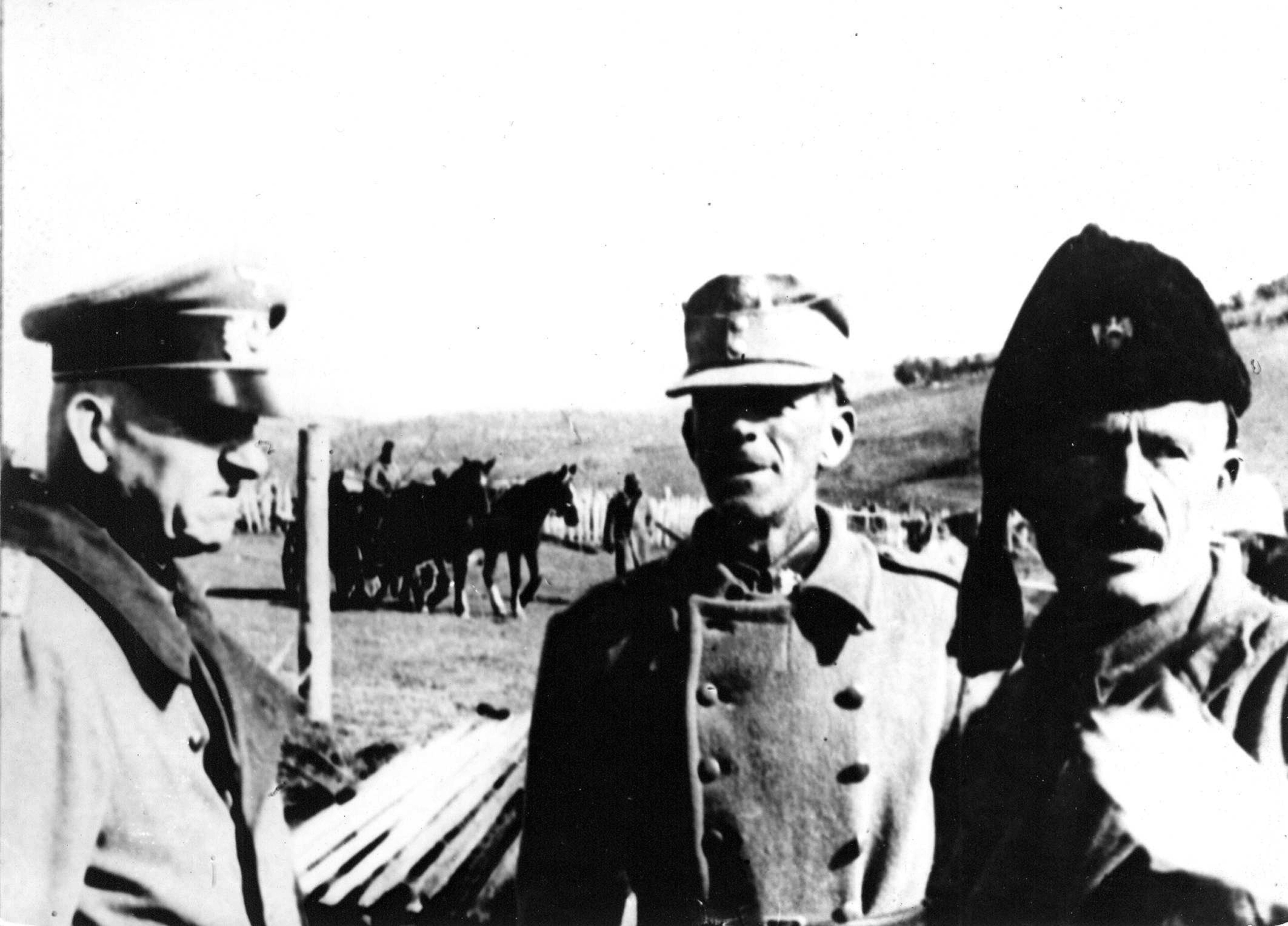
Friedrich Stahl, commander of the Kozara Offensive, with a Croatian Home Guard officer and Bosanska Krajina Chetnik commander Rade Radić in central Bosnia, mid-1942

The resulting Third Enemy Offensive, launched on 15 April, targeted all insurgents between Sarajevo and the Drina. The Croats ultimately vetoed Italian proposals to involve Bosnian Chetniks in the campaign but temporary accords were concluded to include Herzegovinian Chetniks. General Bader judged the operation a success, crediting the Ustasha Black Legion under Lieutenant-Colonel Jure Francetić with significantly helping the Partisans' expulsion from their positions, though German officials remained convinced that Italian sympathy for the Chetniks had hampered the consolidation of these gains elsewhere in the NDH. By June the Partisans had lost practically all their free territory in eastern Bosnia, Montenegro and Herzegovina; the surviving main force began a long march westward toward western Bosnia at the end of June. The march took place partly through Italian-occupied territory; General Glaise von Horstenau noted in his diary that it proceeded under what he described as the Italians' "benevolent encouragement", as the Partisans were fighting mainly with the Ustasha, Croatian Home Guard and Chetniks rather than Italian forces. Having judged the eastern Bosnian operation complete, German commanders turned to the second phase of their plan. After Partisan forces took the town of Prijedor on 16 May, and following the withdrawal of Italian troops who had failed to retake it, the Kozara Offensive began on 10 June under General Friedrich Stahl, who commanded some 31,000 troops, 11,000 German Wehrmacht personnel, nearly 18,000 Ustasha and Home Guard troops and roughly 2,000 Chetniks, against 3,500 Partisans defending the Kozara mountain area near the Ljubija iron mines. Despite their numerical and material superiority the Axis forces required a month and a half to subdue the area, 1,900 Partisans were killed in the fighting, and some 68,000 Serb civilians of the Kozara region were deported to the camps at Jasenovac and Gradina, of whom 24,488 never returned, while a further 1,590 were sent to forced labour in Germany and 2,774 to Norway. Marko Attila Hoare has characterised the campaign as the most systematic genocide practised against the Serbs of the NDH during the war.

=== Partisan consolidation ===
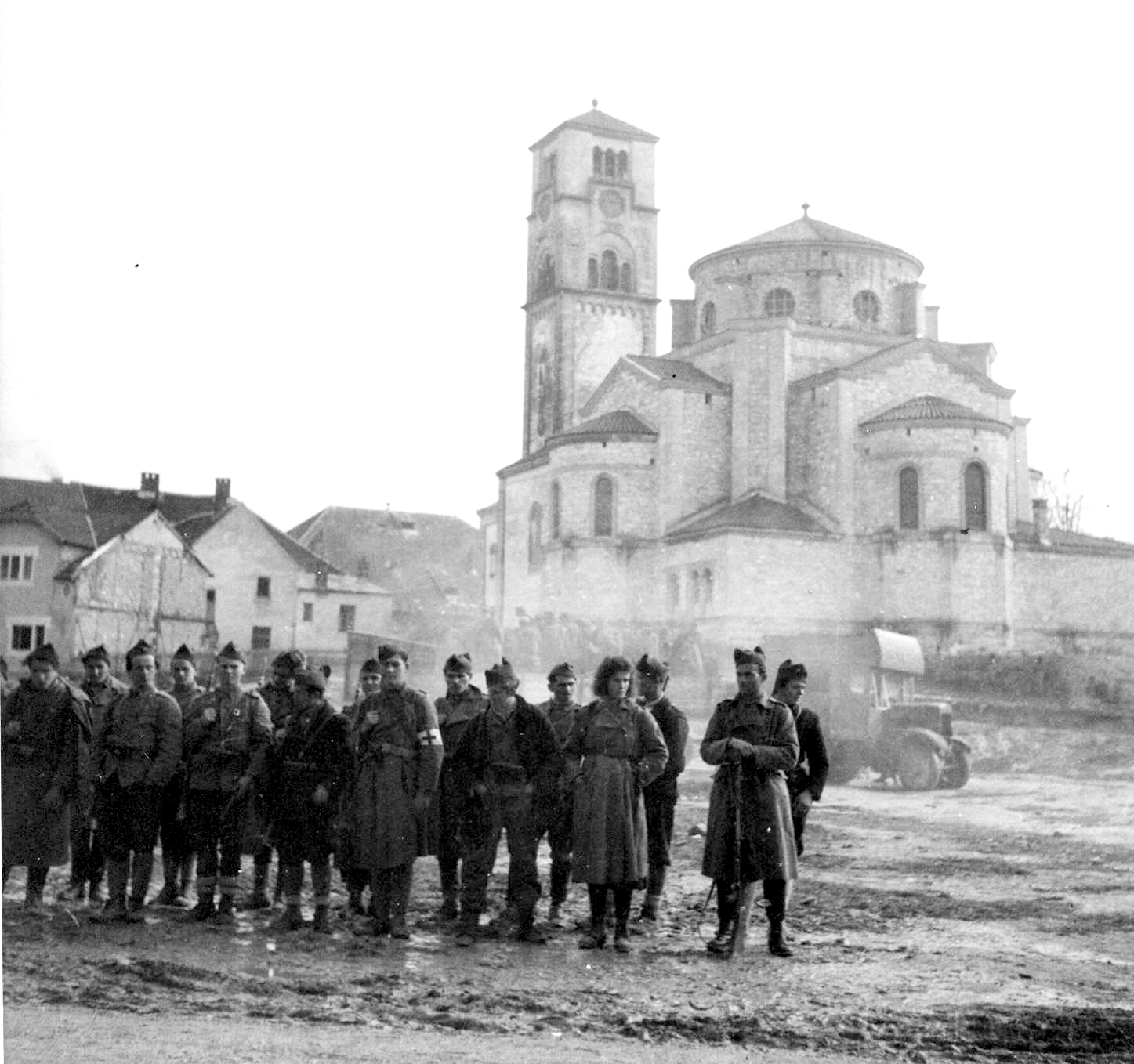
Partisan forces entering Bihać, November 1942

In northwestern Bosnia the Partisans established a powerful base among the Serb population of Bosanska Krajina and drew support from Muslim and Croat sympathisers in the region. Despite their military setbacks, the destruction of weaker units had enabled the Partisans to concentrate committed fighters in elite mobile formations such as the proletarian brigades, giving them an increasing edge in combat. The Partisans also intensified their political organisation, making greater use of political commissars and requiring all new recruits to undergo political instruction. The Ustasha regime's continued persecution of the Serb population drove a growing flow of volunteers toward the Partisans, who were increasingly able to offer the civilian population protection. In a major defeat for Ustasha forces, Partisan units from Bosanska Krajina, Lika and Kordun took Bihać and neighbouring towns on 4 November 1942, in what Enver Redžić described as the Partisans' most serious blow against the Ustasha since the start of the uprising. The victory triggered a rapid expansion of Partisan strength across the region and allowed the movement to establish the so-called Bihać Republic. The Partisans were now established in the heart of the NDH, posing a direct threat to Croatian, Italian and German lines of communication. On 26–27 November the town hosted the first session of the Anti-Fascist Council for the National Liberation of Yugoslavia (AVNOJ), laying the political foundations for a new Yugoslav state. The NDH responded with a sustained propaganda campaign portraying both the Partisans and the Chetniks as instruments of Serbian expansionism, denying any genuine Croatian presence within the Partisan movement and treating AVNOJ's Yugoslav orientation as a direct threat to the NDH's survival. In November 1942, Partisan detachments were officially merged into the National Liberation Army and Partisan Detachments of Yugoslavia (NOV i POJ). The military wing of the movement was further reorganised in this period: thirty-one new brigades were formed between July and December 1942, and on 1 November the first permanent divisions, the 1st and 2nd Proletarian and the 3rd Assault, were established, eventually grouped into the 1st Bosnian and 1st Croatian Corps.

== 1943 ==
=== Critical Axis offensives ===
In the first half of 1943 two Axis offensives came close to defeating the Partisans. They are known by their German code names Operation Weiss ('White') and Operation Schwarz ('Black'), as the Battle of Neretva and the Battle of Sutjeska after the rivers in the areas they were fought, or the Fourth and Fifth Enemy Offensive, respectively, according to former Yugoslav historiography.

On 7 January 1943, the Bulgarian 1st Army also occupied south-west Serbia. Savage pacification measures reduced Partisan activity appreciably. Bulgarian infantry divisions in the Fifth anti-Partisan Offensive blocked the Partisan escape-route from Montenegro into Serbia and also participated in the Sixth anti-Partisan Offensive in Eastern Bosnia.

Negotiations between Germans and Partisans started on 11 March 1943 in Gornji Vakuf, Bosnia. Tito's key officers Vladimir Velebit, Koča Popović and Milovan Đilas brought three proposals, first about an exchange of prisoners, second about the implementation of international law on treatment of prisoners and third about political questions. The delegation expressed concerns about Italian involvement in supplying the Chetnik army and stated that the National Liberation Movement was an independent movement, with no aid from the Soviet Union or the UK. Somewhat later, Đilas and Velebit were brought to Zagreb to continue the negotiations.

In the Fourth Enemy Offensive, also known as the Battle of the Neretva or Operation Weiss ('White'), Axis forces pushed Partisan troops to retreat from western Bosnia to northern Herzegovina, culminating in the Partisan retreat over the Neretva river. This took place from January to April, 1943.

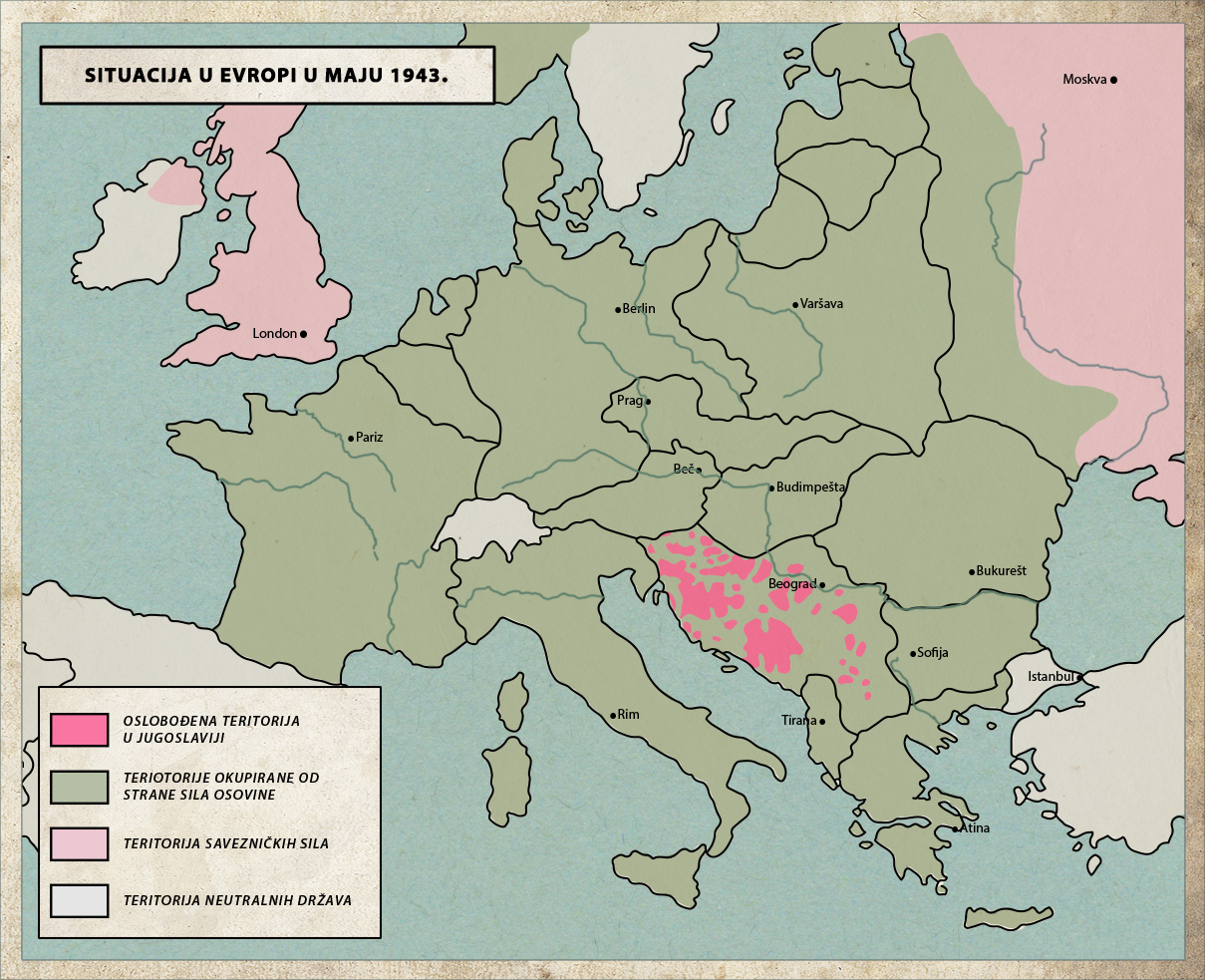
Partisan liberated territory in Yugoslavia, May 1943

The Fifth Enemy Offensive, also known as the Battle of the Sutjeska or Operation Schwarz ('Black'), immediately followed the Fourth Offensive and included a complete encirclement of Partisan forces in southeastern Bosnia and northern Montenegro in May and June 1943.

In that August of my arrival [1943] there were over 30 enemy divisions on the territory of Jugoslavia, as well as a large number of satellite and police formations of Ustashe and Domobrani (military formations of the puppet Croat State), German Sicherheitsdienst, chetniks, Neditch militia, Ljotitch militia, and others. The partisan movement may have counted up to 150,000 fighting men and women (perhaps five per cent women) in close and inextricable co-operation with several million peasants, the people of the country. Partisan numbers were liable to increase rapidly.

The Croatian Home Guard reached its maximum size at the end of 1943, when it had 130,000 men. It also included an air force, the Air Force of the Independent State of Croatia (Zrakoplovstvo Nezavisne Države Hrvatske, or ZNDH), the backbone of which was provided by 500 former Royal Yugoslav Air Force officers and 1,600 NCOs with 125 aircraft. By 1943 the ZNDH was 9,775 strong and equipped with 295 aircraft.

=== Italian capitulation and Allied support for the Partisans ===
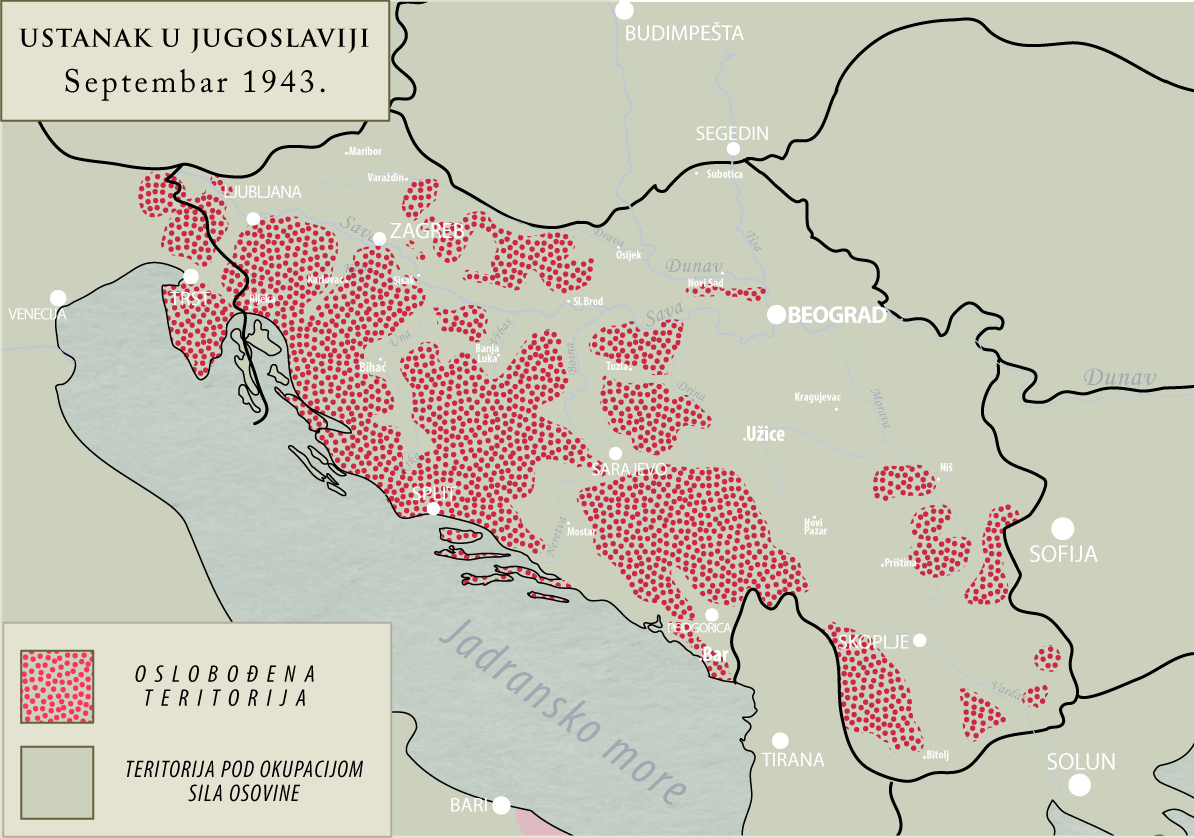
Uprising in occupied Yugoslavia after capitulation of Italy, September 1943

On 8 September 1943, the Italians concluded an armistice with the Allies, leaving 17 divisions stranded in Yugoslavia. All divisional commanders refused to join the Germans. Two Italian infantry divisions joined the Montenegrin Partisans as complete units, while another joined the Albanian Partisans. Other units surrendered to the Germans to face imprisonment in Germany or summary execution. Others surrendered themselves and their arms, ammunition and equipment to Croatian forces or to the Partisans, simply disintegrated, or reached Italy on foot via Trieste or by ship across the Adriatic. The Italian Governorship of Dalmatia was disestablished and the country's possessions were subsequently divided between Germany, which established its Operational Zone of the Adriatic Littoral, and the Independent State of Croatia, which established the new district of Sidraga-Ravni Kotari. The former Italian kingdoms of Albania and of Montenegro were placed under German occupation.

On 25 September 1943, the German High Command launched Operation "Istrien", and on October 21 the military operation "Wolkenbruch" with the aim of destroying Partisan units in the Slovene-populated lands, Istria and the Littoral. In that operation 2,500 Istrians were killed among whom were Partisans and civilians including women, children, and elderly. Partisan units which did not withdraw from Istria in time were completely destroyed. German troops, including the SS division "Prinz Eugen", on September 25 began to carry out a plan for the complete destruction of the Partisans in Primorska and Istria.

Events in 1943 brought about a change in the attitude of the Allies. The Germans were executing Fall Schwarz (Battle of Sutjeska, the Fifth anti-Partisan offensive), one of a series of offensives aimed at the resistance fighters, when F.W.D. Deakin was sent by the British to gather information. His reports contained two important observations. The first was that the Partisans were courageous and aggressive in battling the German 1st Mountain and 104th Light Division, had suffered significant casualties, and required support. The second observation was that the entire German 1st Mountain Division had transited from the Soviet Union on rail lines through Chetnik-controlled territory. British intercepts (ULTRA) of German message traffic confirmed Chetnik timidity. Even though today many circumstances, facts, and motivations remain unclear, intelligence reports resulted in increased Allied interest in Yugoslavia air operations and shifted policy.

The Sixth Enemy Offensive was a series of operations undertaken by the Wehrmacht and the Ustaše after the capitulation of Italy in an attempt to secure the Adriatic coast. It took place in the autumn and winter of 1943/1944.

At this point the Partisans were able to win the moral, as well as limited material support of the Western Allies, who until then had supported Mihailović's Chetnik Forces, but were finally convinced of their collaboration by many intelligence-gathering missions dispatched to both sides during the course of the war.

In September 1943, at Churchill's request, Brigadier General Fitzroy Maclean was parachuted to Tito's headquarters near Drvar to serve as a permanent, formal liaison to the Partisans. While the Chetniks were still occasionally supplied, the Partisans received the bulk of all future support.

When the AVNOJ (the Partisan wartime council in Yugoslavia) was eventually recognized by the Allies, by late 1943, the official recognition of the Partisan Democratic Federal Yugoslavia soon followed. The National Liberation Army of Yugoslavia was recognized by the major Allied powers at the Tehran Conference, when United States agreed to the position of other Allies. The newly recognized Yugoslav government, headed by Prime Minister Tito, was a joint body formed of AVNOJ members and the members of the former government-in-exile in London. The resolution of a fundamental question, whether the new state would remained a monarchy or become a republic, was postponed until the end of the war, as was the status of King Peter II.

Subsequent to switching their support to the Partisans, the Allies set up the RAF Balkan Air Force (at the suggestion of Maclean) with the aim to provide increased supplies and tactical air support for Marshal Tito's Partisan forces.

== 1944 ==
=== Last Axis offensive ===
In January 1944, Tito's forces unsuccessfully attacked Banja Luka. But, while Tito was forced to withdraw, Mihajlović and his forces were also noted by the Western press for their lack of activity.

The Seventh Enemy Offensive was the final Axis attack in western Bosnia in the spring of 1944, which included Operation Rösselsprung (Knight's Leap), an unsuccessful attempt to eliminate Josip Broz Tito personally and annihilate the leadership of the Partisan movement.

=== Partisan growth to domination ===
Allied aircraft specifically started targeting ZNDH (Air Force of the Independent State of Croatia) and Luftwaffe bases and aircraft for the first time as a result of the Seventh Offensive, including Operation Rösselsprung in late May 1944. Up until then Axis aircraft could fly inland almost at will, as long as they remained at low altitude. Partisan units on the ground frequently complained about enemy aircraft attacking them while hundreds of Allied aircraft flew above at higher altitude. This changed during Rösselsprung as Allied fighter-bombers went low en-masse for the first time, establishing full aerial superiority. Consequently, both the ZNDH and Luftwaffe were forced to limit their operations in clear weather to early morning and late afternoon.

The Yugoslav Partisan movement grew to become the largest resistance force in occupied Europe, with 800,000 men organised in 4 field armies. Eventually the Partisans prevailed against all of their opponents as the official army of the newly founded Democratic Federal Yugoslavia (later Socialist Federal Republic of Yugoslavia).

In 1944, the Macedonian and Serbian commands made contact in southern Serbia and formed a joint command, which consequently placed the Macedonian Partisans under the direct command of Marshal Tito. The Slovene Partisans also merged with Tito's forces in 1944.

On 16 June 1944, the Tito-Šubašić agreement between the Partisans and the Yugoslav Government in exile of Peter II was signed on the island of Vis. This agreement was an attempt to form a new Yugoslav government which would include both the communists and the royalists. It called for a merge of the Partisan Anti-Fascist Council of National Liberation of Yugoslavia (Antifašističko V(ij)eće Narodnog Oslobođenja Jugoslavije, AVNOJ) and the Government in exile. The Tito-Šubašić agreement also called on all Slovenes, Croats, and Serbs to join the Partisans. The Partisans were recognized by the Royal Government as Yugoslavia's regular army. Mihajlović and many Chetniks refused to answer the call. The Chetniks were, however, praised for saving 500 downed Allied pilots in 1944; United States President Harry S. Truman posthumously awarded Mihailović the Legion of Merit for his contribution to the Allied victory.

=== Allied advances in Romania and Bulgaria ===
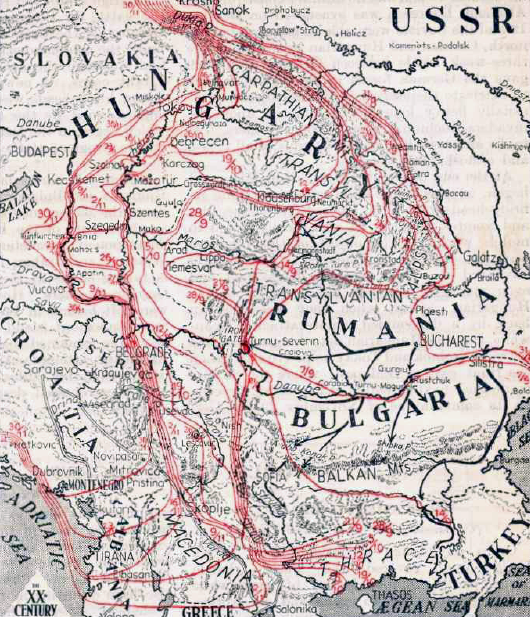
Map of German retreat in autumn 1944 (week by week)

In August 1944 after the Jassy-Kishinev Offensive overwhelmed the front line of Germany's Army Group South Ukraine, King Michael I of Romania staged a coup, Romania quit the war, and the Romanian army was placed under the command of the Red Army. Romanian forces, fighting against Germany, participated in the Prague Offensive. Bulgaria quit as well and, on 10 September, declared war on Germany and its remaining allies. The weak divisions sent by the Axis powers to invade Bulgaria were easily driven back.

In Macedonia, the Germans swiftly disarmed the 1st Occupation Corps of 5 divisions and the 5th Army, despite short-lived resistance by the latter. Survivors fought their way back to the old borders of Bulgaria.

After the occupation of Bulgaria by the Soviet army, negotiations between Tito and the Bulgarian communist leaders were organised which ultimately resulted in a military alliance between the two.

In late September 1944, three Bulgarian armies, some 455,000 strong in total led by General Georgi Marinov Mandjev from Sharkovo, entered Yugoslavia with the strategic task of blocking the German forces withdrawing from Greece.

The new Bulgarian People's Army and the Red Army 3rd Ukrainian Front troops were concentrated at the old Bulgarian-Yugoslav border. At the dawn of October 8, they entered Yugoslavia from the south. The First and Fourth Bulgarian Armies invaded Vardar Macedonia, and the Second Army south-eastern Serbia. The First Army then swung north with the Soviet 3rd Ukrainian Front, through eastern Yugoslavia and south-western Hungary, before linking up with the British 8th Army in Austria in May 1945.

=== Liberation of Belgrade and eastern Yugoslavia ===
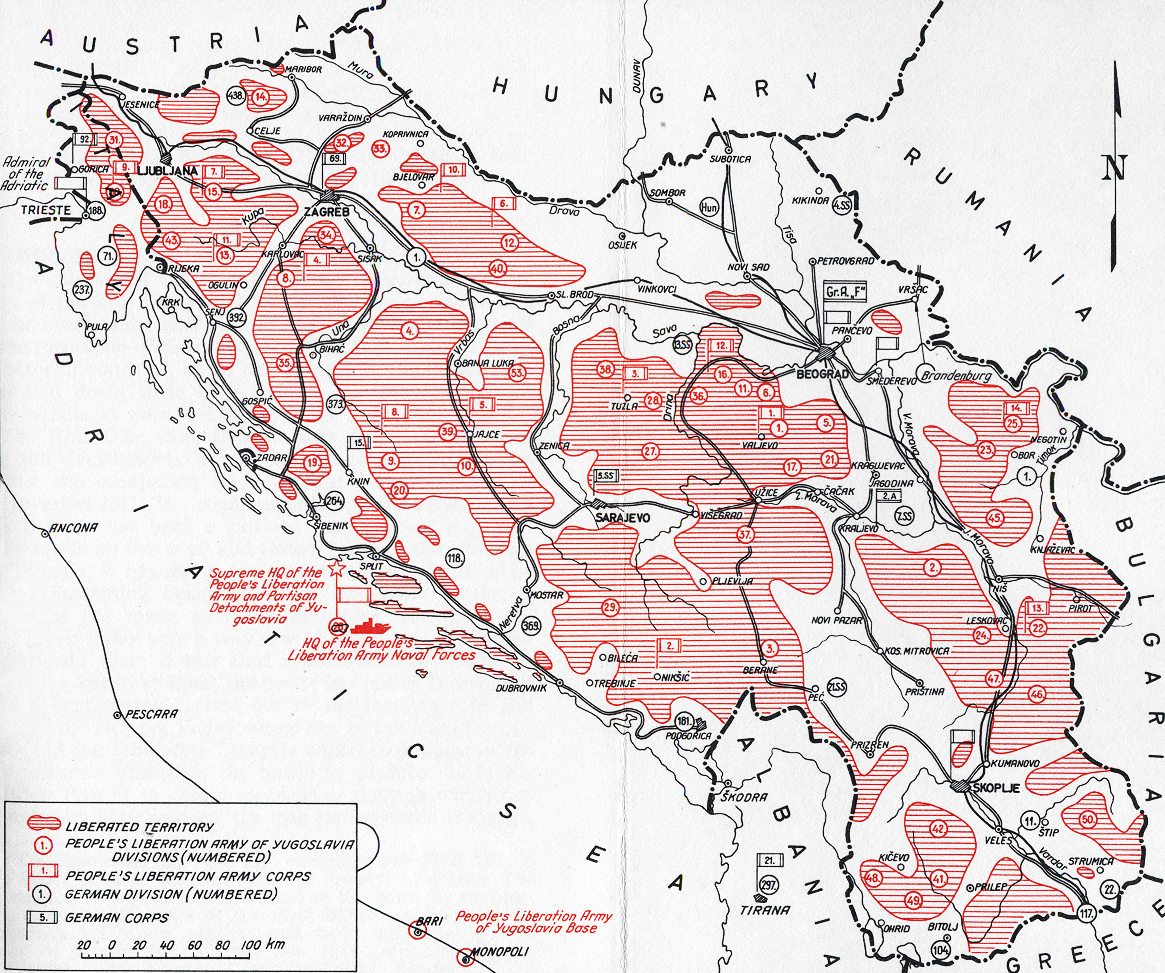
Territories under Partisan control, September 1944

Concurrently, with Allied air support and assistance from the Red Army, the Partisans turned their attention to Central Serbia. The chief objective was to disrupt railroad communications in the valleys of the Vardar and Morava rivers, and prevent Germans from withdrawing their 300,000+ forces from Greece.

The Allied air forces sent 1,973 aircraft (mostly from the US 15th Air Force) over Yugoslavia, which discharged over 3,000 tons of bombs. On 17 August 1944, Tito offered an amnesty to all collaborators. On 12 September, Peter II broadcast a message from London, calling upon all Serbs, Croats and Slovenes to "join the National Liberation Army under the leadership of Marshal Tito". The message reportedly had a devastating effect on the morale of the Chetniks, many of which later defected to the Partisans. They were followed by a substantial number of former Croatian Home Guard and Slovene Home Guard troops.

In September under the leadership of the new Bulgarian pro-Soviet government, four Bulgarian armies, 455,000 strong in total, were mobilized. By the end of September, the Red Army (3rd Ukrainian Front) troops were concentrated at the Bulgarian-Yugoslav border. In the early October 1944 three Bulgarian armies, consisting of around 340,000 men, together with the Red Army, reentered occupied Yugoslavia and moved from Sofia to Niš, Skopje and Pristina to block the German forces withdrawing from Greece. The Red Army organised the Belgrade Offensive, and took the city on 20 October.

The partisans meanwhile attempted to stem the German withdrawal as the German Army Group E abandoned Greece and Albania via Yugoslavia and withdraw to defence lines further north. In September 1944, the allies launched Operation Ratweek, aiming to frustrate German movements through Serbia, Croatia and Slovenia. The British also sent a powerful combat unit launching Operation Floxo (known as 'Floydforce') composing of artillery and engineers which the Partisans were lacking. The Partisans with British artillery were able to stem the Germans and liberated Risan and Podgorica between October and December. By this time the Partisans effectively controlled the entire eastern half of Yugoslavia – Serbia, Macedonia, Montenegro – as well as most of the Dalmatian coast. The Wehrmacht and the forces of the Ustaše-controlled Independent State of Croatia fortified a front in Syrmia that held through the winter of 1944–45 in order to aid the evacuation of Army Group E from the Balkans.

To raise the number of Partisan troops Tito again offered the amnesty on 21 November 1944. In November 1944, the units of the Ustaše militia and the Croatian Home Guard were reorganised and combined to form the Army of the Independent State of Croatia.

== 1945 ==
"Every German unit which could safely evacuate from Yugoslavia might count itself lucky."

The Germans continued their retreat. Having lost the easier withdrawal route through Serbia, they fought to hold the Syrmian front in order to secure the more difficult passage through Kosovo, Sandzak and Bosnia. They even scored a series of temporary successes against the People's Liberation Army. They left Mostar on 12 February 1945. They did not leave Sarajevo until 15 April. Sarajevo had assumed a last-moment strategic position as the only remaining withdrawal route and was held at substantial cost. In early March the Germans moved troops from southern Bosnia to support an unsuccessful counter-offensive in Hungary, which enabled the NOV to score some successes by attacking the Germans' weakened positions. Although strengthened by Allied aid, a secure rear and mass conscription in areas under their control, the one-time partisans found it difficult to switch to conventional warfare, particularly in the open country west of Belgrade, where the Germans held their own until mid-April in spite of all of the raw and untrained conscripts the NOV hurled in a bloody war of attrition against the Syrmian Front.

On 8 March 1945, a coalition Yugoslav government was formed in Belgrade with Tito as Premier and Ivan Šubašić as foreign minister.

=== Partisan general offensive ===
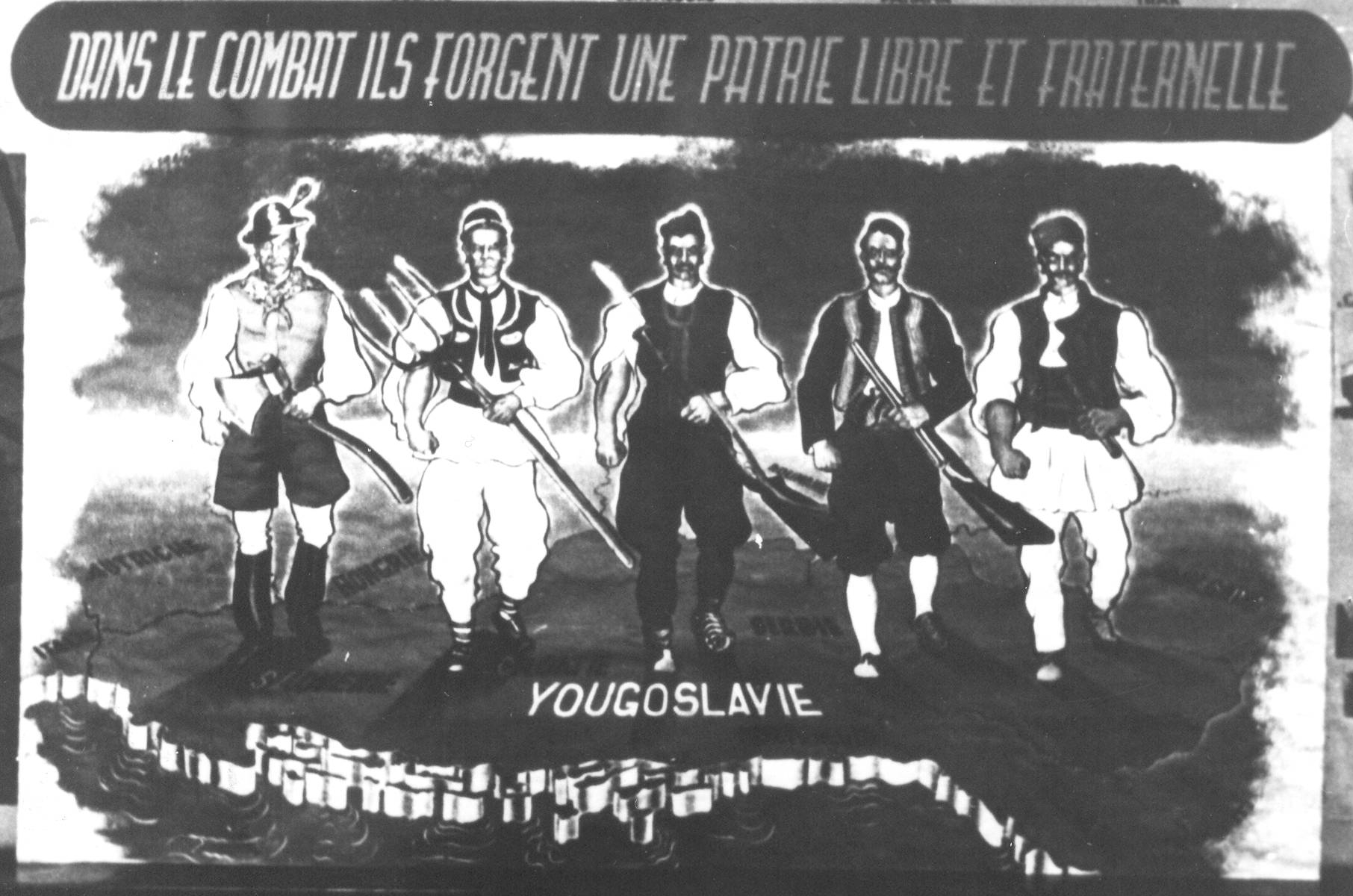
1945 propaganda poster with the five constituent peoples: "In combat they are forging a free and fraternal nation"

On 20 March 1945, the Partisans launched a general offensive in the Mostar-Višegrad-Drina sector. With large swaths of Bosnian, Croatian and Slovenian countryside already under Partisan guerrilla control, the final operations consisted in connecting these territories and capturing major cities and roads. For the general offensive Marshal Josip Broz Tito commanded a Partisan force of about 800,000 men organised into four armies: the

- 1st Army commanded by Peko Dapčević,
- 2nd Army commanded by Koča Popović,
- 3rd Army commanded by Kosta Nađ,
- 4th Army commanded by Petar Drapšin.

In addition, the Yugoslav Partisans had eight independent army corps (the 2nd, 3rd, 4th, 5th, 6th, 7th, 9th, and the 10th).

Set against the Yugoslav Partisans was German General Alexander Löhr of Army Group E (Heeresgruppe E). This Army Group had seven army corps :

- XV Mountain Corps,
- XV Cossack Corps,
- XXI Mountain Corps,
- XXXIV Infantry Corps,
- LXIX Infantry Corps,
- LXXXXVII Infantry Corps.

These corps included seventeen weakened divisions (1st Cossack, 2nd Cossack, 7th SS, 11th Luftwaffe Field Division, 22nd, 41st, 104th, 117th, 138th, 181st, 188th, 237th, 297th, 369th Croat, 373rd Croat, 392nd Croat and the 14th SS Ukrainian Division). In addition to the seven corps, the Axis had remnant naval and Luftwaffe forces, under constant attack by the British Royal Navy, Royal Air Force and United States Air Force.

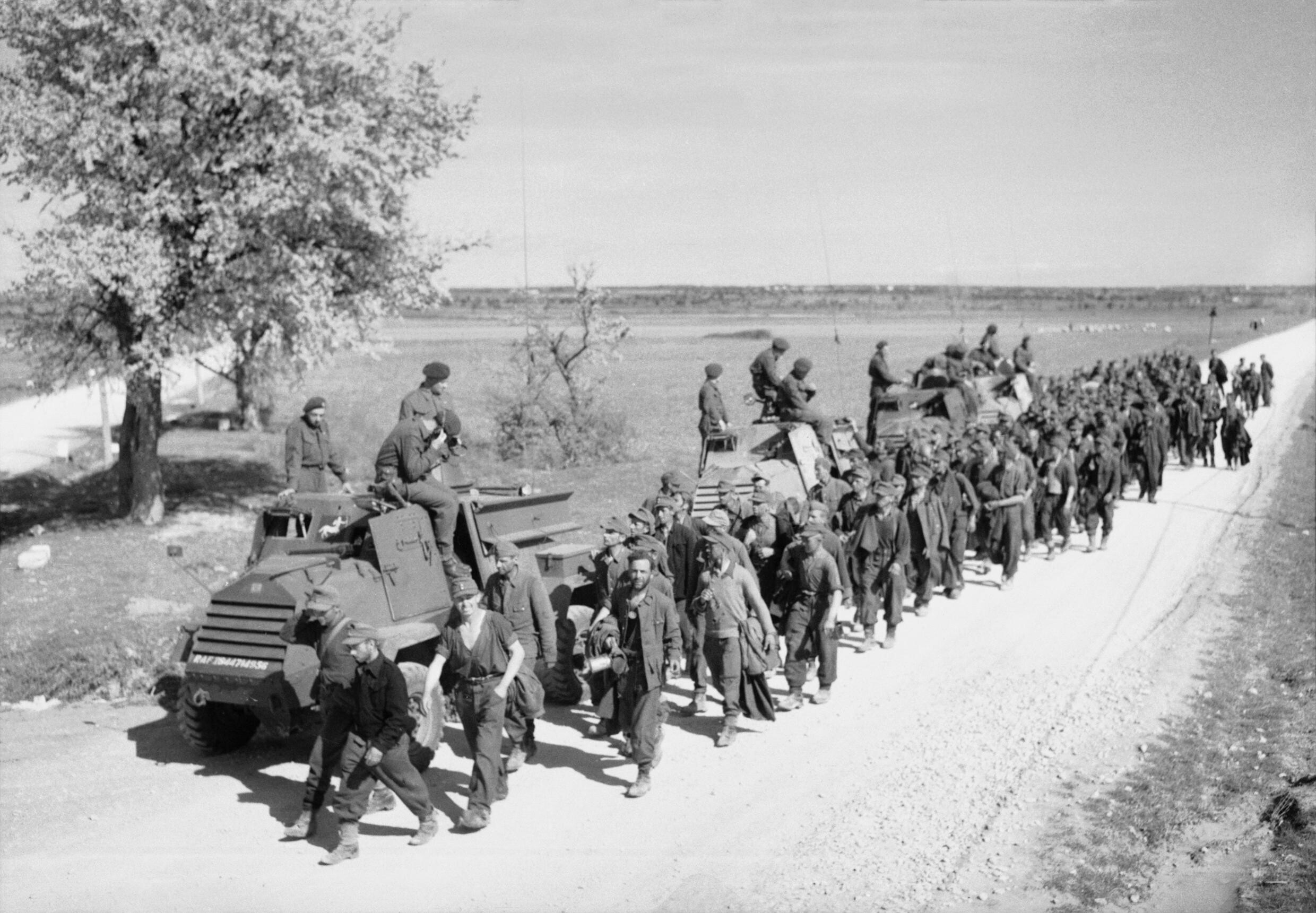
British RAF field regiment in Croatia with German prisoners captured by partisan forces at Bihać

The army of the Independent State of Croatia was at the time composed of eighteen divisions: 13 infantry, two mountain, two assault and one replacement Croatian Divisions, each with its own organic artillery and other support units. There were also several armoured units. From early 1945, the Croatian Divisions were allocated to various German corps and by March 1945 were holding the Southern Front. Securing the rear areas were some 32,000 men of the Croatian gendarmerie (Hrvatsko Oružništvo), organised into 5 Police Volunteer Regiments plus 15 independent battalions, equipped with standard light infantry weapons, including mortars.

The Air Force of the Independent State of Croatia (Zrakoplovstvo Nezavisne Države Hrvatske, or ZNDH) and the units of the Croatian Air Force Legion (Hrvatska Zrakoplovna Legija, or HZL), returned from service on the Eastern Front provided some level of air support (attack, fighter and transport) right up until May 1945, encountering and sometimes defeating opposing aircraft from the British Royal Air Force, United States Air Force and the Soviet Air Force. Although 1944 had been a catastrophic year for the ZNDH, with aircraft losses amounting to 234, primarily on the ground, it entered 1945 with 196 machines. Further deliveries of new aircraft from Germany continued in the early months of 1945 to replace losses. By 10 March, the ZNDH had 23 Messerschmitt Bf 109 G&Ks, three Morane-Saulnier M.S.406, six Fiat G.50 Freccia, and two Messerschmitt Bf 110 G fighters. The final deliveries of up-to-date German Messerschmitt Bf 109 G and K fighter aircraft were still taking place in March 1945. and the ZNDH still had 176 aircraft on its strength in April 1945.

Between 30 March and 8 April 1945, General Mihailović's Chetniks mounted a final attempt to establish themselves as a credible force fighting the Axis in Yugoslavia. The Chetniks under Lieutenant Colonel Pavle Đurišić fought a combination of Ustaša and Croatian Home Guard forces in the Battle on Lijevča field. In late March 1945 elite NDH Army units were withdrawn from the Syrmian front to destroy Djurisic's Chetniks trying to make their way across the northern NDH. The battle was fought near Banja Luka in what was then the Independent State of Croatia and ended in a decisive victory for the Independent State of Croatia forces.

Serbian units included the remnants of the Serbian State Guard and the Serbian Volunteer Corps from the Serbian Military Administration. There were even some units of the Slovene Home Guard (Slovensko domobranstvo, SD) still intact in Slovenia.

By the end of March, 1945, it was obvious to the Croatian Army Command that, although the front remained intact, they would eventually be defeated by sheer lack of ammunition. For this reason, the decision was made to retreat into Austria, in order to surrender to the British forces advancing north from Italy. The German Army was in the process of disintegration and the supply system lay in ruins.

Bihać was liberated by the Partisans the same day that the general offensive was launched. The 4th Army, under the command of Petar Drapšin, broke through the defences of the XVth SS Cossack Cavalry Corps. By 20 April, Drapšin liberated Lika and the Croatian Littoral, including the islands, and reached the old Yugoslav border with Italy. On 1 May, after capturing the Italian territories of Rijeka and Istria from the German LXXXXVII Corps, the Yugoslav 4th Army beat the western Allies to Trieste by one day.

The Yugoslav 2nd Army, under the command of Koča Popović, forced a crossing of the Bosna River on 5 April, capturing Doboj, and reached the Una River. On 6 April, the 2nd, 3rd, and 5th Corps of the Yugoslav Partisans took Sarajevo from the German XXI Corps. On 12 April, the Yugoslav 3rd Army, under the command of Kosta Nađ, forced a crossing of the Drava river. The 3rd Army then fanned out through Podravina, reached a point north of Zagreb, and crossed the old Austrian border with Yugoslavia in the Dravograd sector. The 3rd Army closed the ring around the enemy forces when its advanced motorized detachments linked up with detachments of the 4th Army in Carinthia.

Also, on 12 April, the Yugoslav 1st Army, under the command of Peko Dapčević penetrated the fortified front of the German XXXIV Corps in Syrmia. By 22 April, the 1st Army had smashed the fortifications and was advancing towards Zagreb.

The long-drawn out liberation of western Yugoslavia caused more victims among the population. The breakthrough of the Syrmian front on 12 April was, in Milovan Đilas's words, "the greatest and bloodiest battle our army had ever fought", and it would not have been possible had it not been for Soviet instructors and arms. By the time Dapčević's NOV units had reached Zagreb, on 9 May 1945, they had perhaps lost as many as 36,000 dead. There were by then over 400,000 refugees in Zagreb. After entering Zagreb with the Yugoslav 2nd Army, both armies advanced in Slovenia.

=== Final operations ===
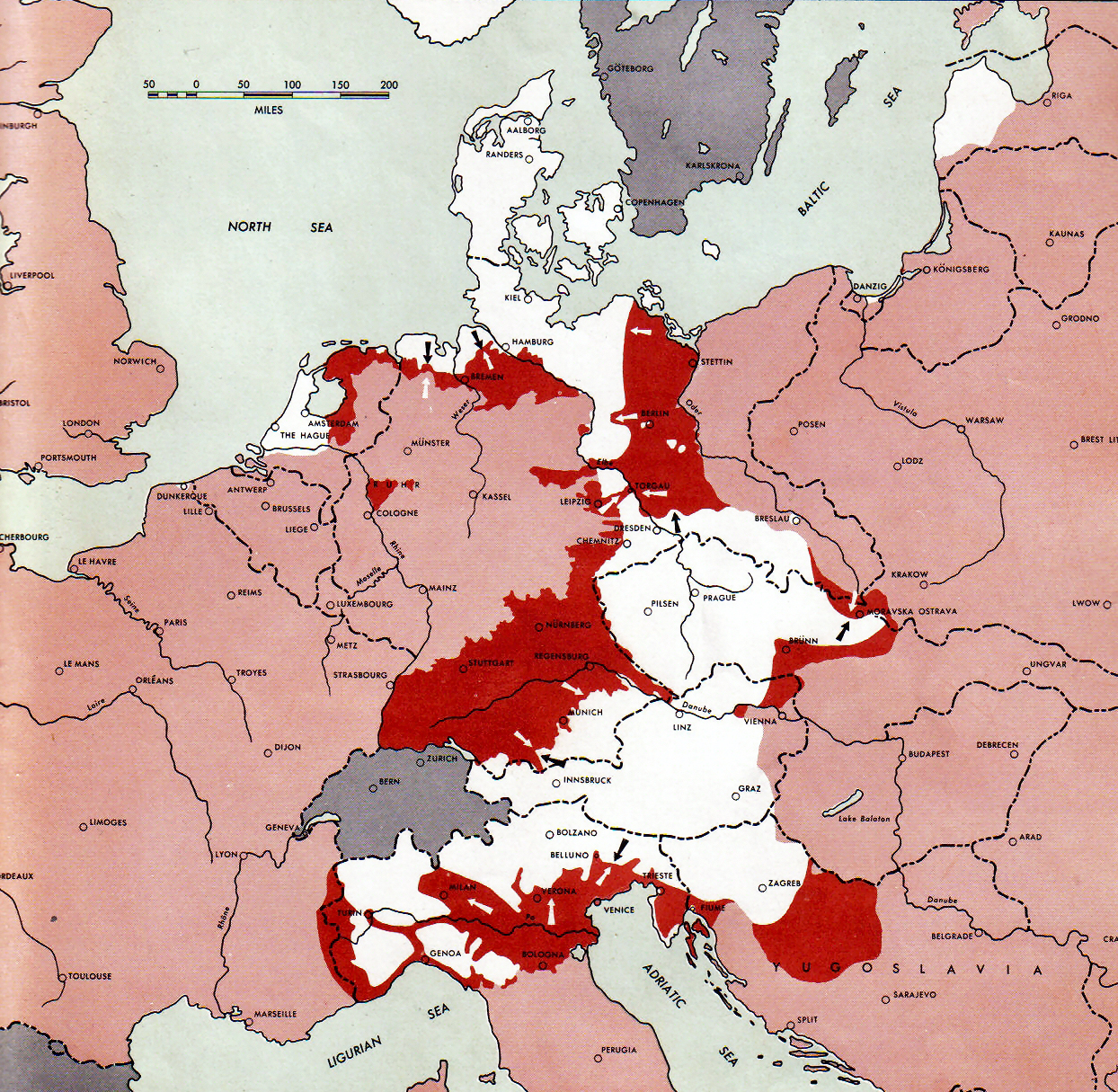
Front lines in Europe 1 May 1945

On 2 May, the German capital city, Berlin, fell to the Red Army. On 8 May 1945, the Germans surrendered unconditionally and the war in Europe officially ended. The Italians had quit the war in 1943, the Bulgarians in 1944, and the Hungarians earlier in 1945. Despite the German capitulation, however, sporadic fighting still took place in Yugoslavia. On 7 May, Zagreb was evacuated, on 9 May, Maribor and Ljubljana were captured by the Partisans, and Löhr, Commander-in-Chief of Army Group E was forced to sign the total surrender of the forces under his command at Topolšica, near Velenje, Slovenia, on Wednesday 9 May 1945. Only the Croatian and other anti-Partisan forces remained.

From 10 to 15 May, the Yugoslav Partisans continued to face resistance from Croatian, and other anti-Partisan forces throughout the rest of Croatia and Slovenia. The Battle of Poljana started on 14 May, ending on 15 May 1945 at Poljana, near Prevalje in Slovenia. It was the culmination and last of a series of battles between Yugoslav Partisans and a large (in excess of 30,000) mixed column of German Army soldiers together with Croatian Ustaše, Croatian Home Guard, Slovenian Home Guard, and other anti-Partisan forces who were attempting to retreat to Austria. Battle of Odžak was the last World War II battle in Europe. The battle began on 19 April 1945 and lasted until 25 May 1945, 17 days after the end of the war in Europe.

=== Aftermath ===
On 5 May, in the town of Palmanova (50 km northwest of Trieste), between 2,400 and 2,800 members of the Serbian Volunteer Corps surrendered to the British. On 12 May, about 2,500 additional Serbian Volunteer Corps members surrendered to the British at Unterbergen on the Drava River. On 11 and 12 May, British troops in Klagenfurt, Austria, were harassed by arriving forces of the Yugoslav Partisans, who sought to claim the city as part of Yugoslav territory. In Belgrade, the British ambassador to the Yugoslav coalition government handed Tito a note demanding that the Yugoslav troops withdraw from Austria.

On 15 May 1945 a large column of the Croatian Home Guard, the Ustaše, the XVth SS Cossack Cavalry Corps and the remnants of the Serbian State Guard, and the Serbian Volunteer Corps, arrived at the southern Austrian border near the town of Bleiburg. The representatives of the Independent State of Croatia attempted to negotiate a surrender to the British under the terms of the Geneva Convention that they had joined in 1943, and were recognised by it as a "belligerent", but were ignored. Most of the people in the column were turned over to the Yugoslav government in what became known as the Bleiburg repatriations; most of the Cossack collaborators were repatriated at Lienz and Judenburg. Following the repatriations, the Partisans proceeded to brutalize the POWs. The Partisans' actions were partly done for revenge as well as to suppress the potential continuation of armed struggle within Yugoslavia.

On 15 May, Tito placed Partisan forces in Austria under Allied control. A few days later he agreed to withdraw them. By 20 May, Yugoslav troops in Austria had begun to withdraw. On 8 June, the United States, the United Kingdom, and Yugoslavia agreed on the control of Trieste. On 11 November, parliamentary elections were held in Yugoslavia. In these elections the communists had an important advantage because they controlled the police, judiciary and media. For that reason the opposition did not want to participate in the elections. On 29 November, in accordance with election result, Peter II was deposed by communist dominated Yugoslavia's Constituent Assembly. On the same day, the Federal People's Republic of Yugoslavia was established as a socialist state during the first meeting of the Yugoslav Parliament in Belgrade. Tito was appointed prime minister. The autonomist wing in the Communist Party of Macedonia, which dominated during World War II, was finally pushed aside in 1945 after the Second Assembly of the ASNOM.

On 13 March 1946, Mihailović was captured by agents of the Yugoslav Department of National Security (Odsjek Zaštite Naroda or OZNA). From 10 June to 15 July of the same year, he was tried for high treason and war crimes. On 15 July, he was found guilty and sentenced to death by firing squad.

On 16 July, a clemency appeal was rejected by the Presidium of the National Assembly. During early 18 July, Mihailović, together with nine other Chetnik and Nedić's officers, were executed in Lisičji Potok. This execution essentially ended the World War II-era civil war between the communist Partisans and the royalist Chetniks.

== War crimes and atrocities ==
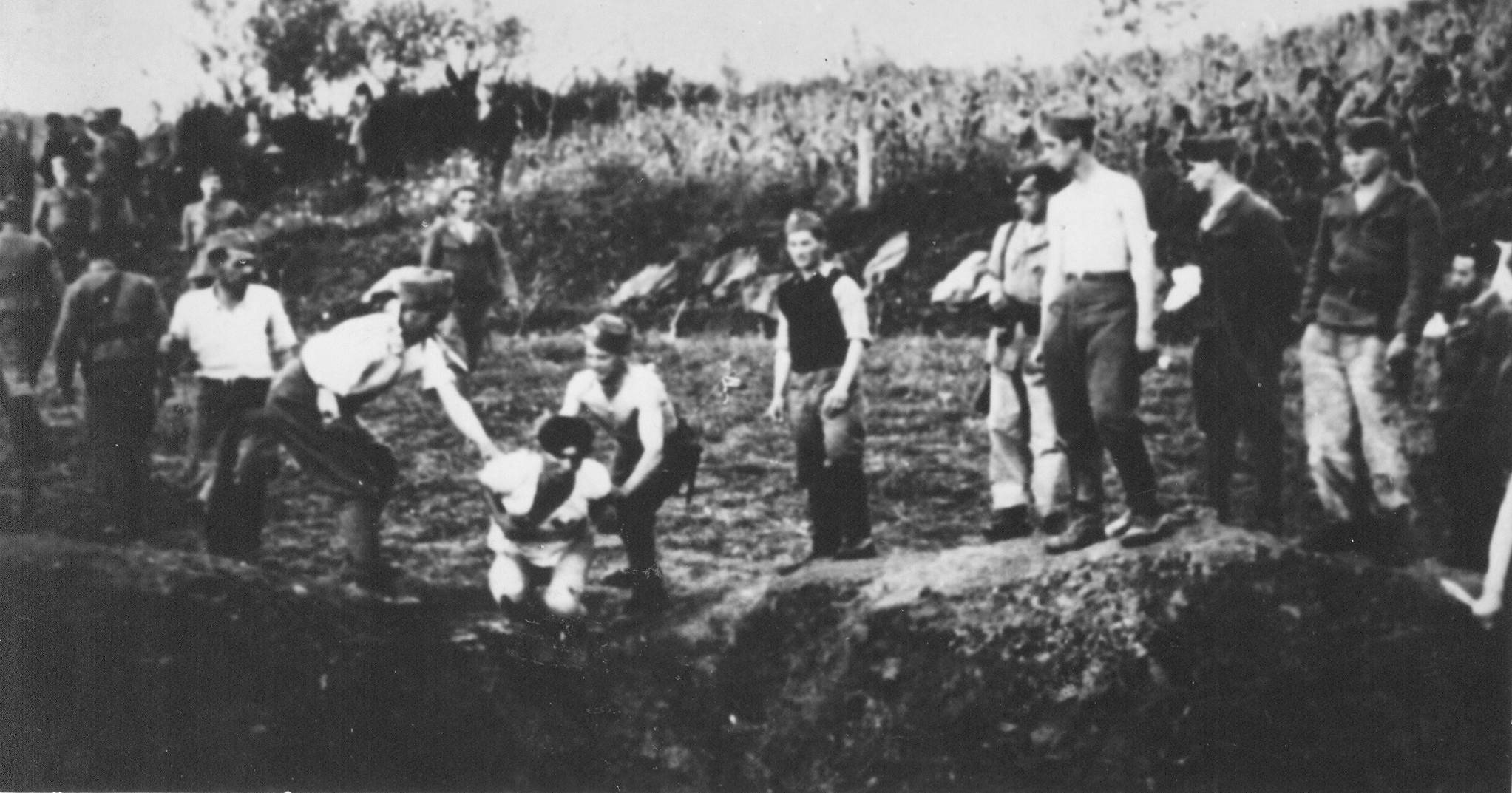
Ustaše militia execute prisoners near the Jasenovac concentration camp.

War crimes and atrocities against civilians were widespread throughout the conflict and were carried out by occupying forces, collaborationist regimes and local factions. Non-combat victims included the majority of the country's Jewish population, Serbs, Roma and other persecuted groups, many of whom were killed in concentration and extermination camps such as Jasenovac, Stara Gradiška, Banjica and Sajmište, operated by occupying authorities and collaborationist regimes.

=== The Holocaust in Yugoslavia ===
According to the United States Holocaust Memorial Museum, the Jewish population of Yugoslavia in 1941 was approximately 82,242, of whom about 67,228 were killed during the Holocaust. (Note: These figures refer specifically to Jewish victims and do not include other groups persecuted and killed during the war, such as Serbs or Roma.)

Region	Jewish population	Deaths
Slovenia (German-occupied)	1,500 (1937)	1,300
Serbia with Banat and Sandžak (German-occupied)	17,200 (1937)	15,060
Macedonia (Bulgarian-occupied)	7,762 (1941)	6,982
Pirot (Bulgarian-occupied Serbia)	—	140
Albanian-annexed Kosovo	550 (1937)	210
Croatia with Dalmatia and Bosnia-Herzegovina	39,400 (1937)	30,148
Montenegro (German-occupied)	30 (1937)	28
Bačka and Baranja (Hungarian-annexed)	16,000 (1937)	13,500

The Ustashas regime in the Independent State of Croatia (mostly Croats, but also Muslims and others) committed genocide against Serbs, Jews, Roma and targeted anti-fascist Croats. The Chetniks (mostly Serbs, but also Montenegrins and others) pursued genocide against Muslims and Croats and carried out violence against pro-Partisan Serbs. The Italian occupation authorities instigated ethnic cleansing (Italianization) against Slovenes and Croats. The Wehrmacht carried out mass executions of civilians in retaliation for resistance activity (e.g. the Kragujevac massacre and the Kraljevo massacre). SS Division "Prinz Eugen" massacred large numbers of civilians and prisoners of war. Hungarian occupation troops massacred civilians (mostly Serbs and Jews) during a major raid in southern Bačka, under the pretext of suppressing resistance activities.

During and after the final stages of the war, Yugoslav communist authorities and Partisan troops carried out reprisals against those associated with the Axis.

=== Ustashas regime (Independent State of Croatia) ===
The Ustashas, a Croatian ultranationalist and fascist movement which operated from 1929 to 1945 and was led by Ante Pavelić, gained control of the newly formed Independent State of Croatia (NDH) established with the support of Nazi Germany and Fascist Italy following the invasion of Yugoslavia. The Ustashas sought to create an ethnically homogeneous state by carrying out policies of mass persecution and killing against Serbs, Jews and Roma. The regime has been described as pursuing a policy of killing, expelling and forcibly converting segments of the Serb population. Early massacres of Serbs began in April 1941, including the Gudovac massacre. Mass violence spread across the NDH in the following months, particularly in Banija, Kordun, Lika, northwest Bosnia and eastern Herzegovina. Serb civilians were subjected to large scale killings carried out using a range of methods, including shootings, executions in pits and other forms of violence. Ustasha Militia units destroyed villages and carried out widespread violence against civilians, including acts of torture and sexual violence.

The Ustashas also established a network of camps throughout the NDH. Some were used to detain political opponents and those regarded as enemies of the state, some were transit and resettlement camps for the deportation and transfer of populations, while others functioned as sites of mass murder. The largest was the Jasenovac concentration camp, a complex of subcamps located some 100 km southeast of Zagreb. By the end of 1941, along with Serbs and Roma, NDH authorities incarcerated the majority of the country's Jews in camps including Jadovno, Kruščica, Loborgrad, Đakovo, Tenja and Jasenovac. Nearly the entire Romani population of the NDH was also killed by the Ustashas.

Historians have noted that in the NDH the persecution and mass killing of Jews and other groups formed part of the Ustasha regime’s own ideological programme, rather than being imposed by German authorities. According to historian Saul Friedländer, during 1941 and early 1942 the Ustashas were responsible for the killing of between 300,000 and 400,000 Serbs, as well as most of the country’s Jewish population.

=== Chetniks ===
The Chetniks were a Serb royalist and nationalist movement that initially resisted the Axis before cooperating with Axis forces. They later collaborated extensively and systematically with Italian occupation forces and, in the later stages of the war, with German and Ustasha forces. The movement was not centrally organised, and collaboration varied between different Chetnik groups and regions. The Chetnik programme envisaged the creation of an ethnically homogeneous Greater Serbian state by cleansing non-Serb populations, mainly Muslims and Croats, from territories intended for incorporation into their post-war state.

The Chetniks carried out massacres of Muslim civilians in villages they captured. These occurred primarily in eastern Bosnia, in towns and municipalities such as Goražde, Foča, Srebrenica and Višegrad. Later, "cleansing actions" against Muslims took place in counties in Sandžak. Actions against Croats were smaller in scale but similar in nature. Croats were killed in Bosnia, Herzegovina, northern Dalmatia, and Lika. The Chetniks also carried out violence against Serb civilians suspected of supporting the Partisans.

=== Partisans ===
The Partisans participated in massacres of civilians during and after the war. In the immediate postwar period, Partisan forces carried out reprisals against prisoners of war and individuals perceived as Axis collaborators or sympathisers. These included executions without trial and mass killings in several areas. Forced marches and executions of large numbers of captured soldiers and civilians (predominantly Croats associated with the NDH, but also Slovenes and others) occurred during the Bleiburg repatriations. Atrocities also included the Kočevski Rog massacre and violence against the Italian population in Istria (the foibe massacres). In Serbia, purges targeting individuals suspected of collaboration resulted in tens of thousands of deaths. The postwar period also saw the expulsions of the German population from Yugoslavia.

=== Bulgarian forces ===
In Yugoslav territories occupied by Bulgaria, particularly Vardar Macedonia (which before 1941 formed part of the Vardar Banovina of the Kingdom of Yugoslavia) and the Pirot region, Bulgarian authorities introduced anti-Jewish legislation, including registration, forced labour and confiscation of property. In March 1943 Bulgarian police and military units arrested the Jewish population of Skopje, Bitola and Štip and detained them in a transit camp in Skopje. Between 22 and 29 March 1943 more than 7,000 Jews from these areas were deported via Bulgaria to the Treblinka extermination camp where they were murdered.

=== German forces ===
In occupied Serbia, in order to suppress resistance and terrorise the population, the Germans implemented a policy of reprisal killings, under which 100 hostages were shot for every German soldier killed and 50 for every wounded soldier. (Note: All sides practiced the shooting of hostages on a large scale, however, the largest numbers of hostages were shot by the Germans in Serbia between 1941 and 1944.) Those primarily targeted for execution included Jews and Serbian communists. The most notable examples were the massacres in the villages of Kraljevo and Kragujevac in October 1941.

German authorities also established and operated a network of concentration camps in occupied Serbia, including Banjica, Sajmište and Topovske Šupe, where Jews, anti-fascists and other detainees were imprisoned and killed. Executions were carried out regularly; the first mass execution at Banjica took place in December 1941 after which executions continued throughout the occupation. In the persecution of Jews, German authorities were assisted by Milan Nedić’s puppet government and other auxiliary forces, which helped enforce anti-Jewish measures.

According to historian Christopher R. Browning, the mass executions of Jewish men in 1941 were carried out primarily by Wehrmacht units rather than the SS. In early 1942, Jewish women and children were confined in the Sajmište concentration camp near Belgrade, where they were murdered in gas vans and buried in unmarked mass graves. The camp operated under German authority; it was guarded by units of the Ordnungspolizei and administered by the Sicherheitspolizei (SiPo-SD), which coordinated arrests, executions and the gassing operations. In December 1943, Paul Blobel's Kommando 1005 was deployed to exhume and burn bodies in an effort to destroy evidence of these killings.

=== Hungarian forces ===
Thousands of Serbs and Jews were massacred by Hungarian occupation forces in the region of Bačka, the territory occupied and annexed by Hungary since 1941. Several high-ranking military officials were complicit in the atrocities. The most notorious episode was the January 1942 Novi Sad raid during which Hungarian army and gendarmerie units killed more than 3,000 civilians, primarily Serbs and Jews.

=== Italian forces ===
In April 1941, Italy invaded Yugoslavia, annexing or occupying large portions of Slovenia, Croatia, Herzegovina, Montenegro, Serbia and Macedonia, while directly annexing the Province of Ljubljana, Gorski Kotar and the Governorate of Dalmatia, along with most Croatian islands. To suppress resistance led by the Slovenian and Croatian Partisans, Italian forces employed tactics including "summary executions, hostage-taking, reprisals, internments and the burning of houses and villages." These measures were particularly extensive in the Province of Ljubljana, where the civilian population was subjected to repression and deported to concentration camps as part of a policy of Italianization.

== Casualties ==
=== Yugoslav casualties ===
Victims by nationality
Nationality	1964 list	Kočović	Žerjavić
Serbs	346,740	487,000	530,000
Croats	83,257	207,000	192,000
Slovenes	42,027	32,000	42,000
Montenegrins	16,276	50,000	20,000
Macedonians	6,724	7,000	6,000
Muslims	32,300	86,000	103,000
Other Slavs	–	12,000	7,000
Albanians	3,241	6,000	18,000
Jews	45,000	60,000	57,000
Gypsies	–	27,000	18,000
Germans	–	26,000	28,000
Hungarians	2,680	–	–
Slovaks	1,160	–	–
Turks	686	–	–
Others	–	14,000	6,000
Unknown	16,202	–	–
Total	597,323	1,014,000	1,027,000

Casualties by location according to the 1964 Yugoslav list
Location	Death toll	Survived
Bosnia and Herzegovina	177,045	49,242
Croatia	194,749	106,220
Macedonia	19,076	32,374
Montenegro	16,903	14,136
Slovenia	40,791	101,929
Serbia (proper)	97,728	123,818
AP Kosovo (Serbia)	7,927	13,960
AP Vojvodina (Serbia)	41,370	65,957
Unknown	1,744	2,213
Total	597,323	509,849

The Yugoslav government estimated the number of casualties to be at 1,704,000 and submitted the figure to the International Reparations Commission in 1946 without any documentation. An estimate of 1.7 million war related deaths was later submitted to the Allied Reparations Committee in 1948, despite it being an estimate of total demographic loss that covered the expected population if war did not break out, the number of unborn children, and losses from emigration and disease. After Germany requested verifiable data the Yugoslav Federal Bureau of Statistics created a nationwide survey in 1964. The total number of those killed was found to be 597,323. The list stayed a state secret until 1989 when it was published for the first time.

The U.S. Bureau of the Census published a report in 1954 that concluded that Yugoslav war related deaths were 1,067,000. The U.S. Bureau of the Census noted that the official Yugoslav government figure of 1.7 million war dead was overstated because it "was released soon after the war and was estimated without the benefit of a postwar census". A study by Vladimir Žerjavić estimates total war related deaths at 1,027,000. Military losses are estimated at 237,000 Yugoslav partisans and 209,000 collaborators, while civilian losses at 581,000, including 57,000 Jews. Losses of the Yugoslav Republics were Bosnia 316,000; Serbia 273,000; Croatia 271,000; Slovenia 33,000; Montenegro 27,000; Macedonia 17,000; and killed abroad 80,000. Statistician Bogoljub Kočović calculated that the actual war losses were 1,014,000. The late Jozo Tomasevich, Professor Emeritus of Economics at San Francisco State University, believes that the calculations of Kočović and Žerjavić "seem to be free of bias, we can accept them as reliable". Stjepan Meštrović estimated that about 850,000 people were killed in the war. Vego cites figures from 900,000 to 1,000,000 dead. Stephen R. A'Barrow estimates that the war caused 446,000 dead soldiers and 514,000 dead civilians, or 960,000 dead in total from the Yugoslav population out of 15 million.

Kočović's research into human losses in Yugoslavia during World War Two was considered to be the first objective examination of the issue. Shortly after Kočović published his findings in Žrtve drugog svetskog rata u Jugoslaviji, Vladeta Vučković, a U.S. based college professor, claimed in a London-based émigré magazine that he had participated in the calculation of the number of victims in Yugoslavia in 1947. Vučković claimed that the figure of 1,700,000 originated with him, explaining that as an employee of the Yugoslav Federal Statistical Office, he was ordered to estimate the number of casualties suffered by Yugoslavia during the war, using appropriate statistical tools. He came up with an estimated demographic (not real) population loss of 1.7 million. He did not intend for his estimate to be used as a calculation of actual losses. However, Foreign Minister Edvard Kardelj took this figure as the real loss in his negotiations with the Inter-Allied Reparations Agency. This figure had also already been used by Marshal Tito in May 1945, and the figure of 1,685,000 was used by Mitar Bakić, secretary general of the Presidium of the Yugoslav government in an address to foreign correspondents in August 1945. The Yugoslav Reparations Commission had also already communicated the figure of 1,706,000 to the Inter-Allied Reparations Agency in Paris in late 1945. Tito's figure of 1.7 million was aimed at both maximizing war compensation from Germany and demonstrating to the world that the heroism and suffering of Yugoslavs during the Second World War surpassed that of all other peoples save only those of the USSR, and, perhaps, Poland.

The reasons for the high human toll in Yugoslavia were as follows:

1. Military operations of five main armies (Germans, Italians, Ustaše, Yugoslav partisans and Chetniks).
2. German forces, under express orders from Hitler, fought with a special vengeance against the Serbs, who were considered Untermensch. One of the worst massacres during the German military occupation of Serbia was the Kragujevac massacre.
3. Deliberate acts of reprisal against target populations were perpetrated by all combatants. All sides practiced the shooting of hostages on a large scale. At the end of the war, many Ustaše collaborators were killed in the Bleiburg death marches.
4. The systematic extermination of large numbers of people for political, religious or racial reasons. The most numerous victims were Serbs killed by the Ustaše. Croats and Muslims were also killed by the Chetniks.
5. The reduced food supply caused famine and disease.
6. Allied bombing of German supply lines caused civilian casualties. The hardest hit localities were Podgorica, Leskovac, Zadar and Belgrade.
7. The demographic losses due to a 335,000 reduction in the number of births and emigration of about 660,000 are not included with war casualties.

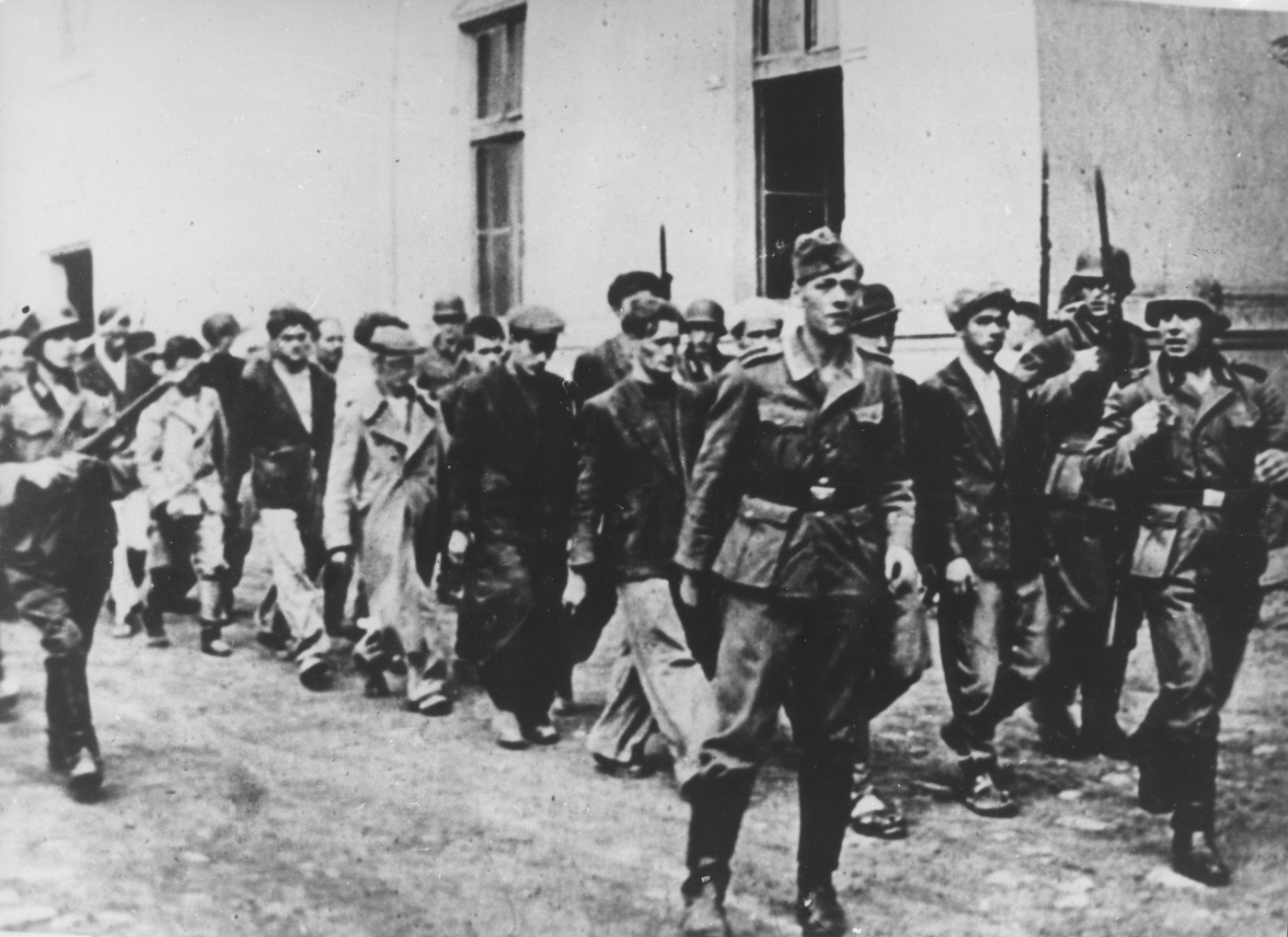
Germans escorting people from Kragujevac and its surrounding area to be executed

==== Slovenia ====
In Slovenia, the Institute for Contemporary History, Ljubljana launched a comprehensive research on the exact number of victims of World War II in Slovenia in 1995. After more than a decade of research, the final report was published in 2005, which included a list of names. The number of victims was set at 89,404. The figure also includes the victims of summary killings by the Communist regime immediately after the war (around 13,500 people). The results of the research came as a shock for the public, since the actual figures were more than 30% higher than the highest estimates during the Yugoslav period. Even counting only the number of deaths up to May 1945 (thus excluding the military prisoners killed by the Yugoslav Army between May and July 1945), the number remains considerably higher than the highest previous estimates (around 75,000 deaths versus a previous estimate of 60,000).

There are several reasons for such a difference. The new comprehensive research also included Slovenes killed by the Partisan resistance, both in battle (members of collaborationist and anti-Communist units), and civilians (around 4,000 between 1941 and 1945). Furthermore, the new estimates includes all the Slovenians from Nazi-annexed Slovenia who were drafted in the Wehrmacht and died either in battle or in prisoner camps during the war. The figure also includes the Slovenes from the Julian March who died in the Italian Army (1940–43), those from Prekmurje who died in the Hungarian Army, and those who fought and died in various Allied (mostly British) units. The figure does not include victims from Venetian Slovenia (except of those who joined the Slovenian Partisan units), nor does it include the victims among Carinthian Slovenes (again with the exception of those fighting in the Partisan units) and Hungarian Slovenes. 47% percent of casualties during the war were partisans, 33% were civilians (of which 82% were killed by Axis powers or Slovene home guard), and 20% were members of the Slovene home guard.

==== Territory of the NDH ====
According to Žerjavić's research on the losses of the Serbs in the NDH, 82,000 died as members of the Yugoslav Partisans, and 23,000 as Chetniks and Axis collaborators. Of the civilian casualties, 78,000 were killed by the Ustaše in direct terror and in camps, 45,000 by German forces, 15,000 by Italian forces, 34,000 in battles between the Ustaše, the Chetniks, and the Partisans, and 25,000 died of typhoid. A further 20,000 died in the Sajmište concentration camp. According to Ivo Goldstein, on NDH territory 45,000 of Croats are killed as Partisans while 19,000 perishing in prisons or camps.

Žerjavić estimated the structure of the actual war and post-war losses of Croats and Bosniaks. According to his research, 69–71,000 Croats died as members of the NDH armed forces, 43–46,000 as members of the Yugoslav Partisans, and 60–64,000 as civilians, in direct terror and in camps. Outside of the NDH, a further 14,000 Croats died abroad; 4,000 as Partisans and 10,000 civilian victims of terror or in camps. Regarding Bosniaks, including Muslims of Croatia, he estimated that 29,000 died as members of the NDH armed forces, 11,000 as members of the Yugoslav Partisans, while 37,000 were civilians and a further 3,000 Bosniaks were killed abroad; 1,000 Partisans and 2,000 civilians. Of the total Croat and Bosniak civilian casualties in the NDH, his research showed that 41,000 civilian deaths (18,000+ Croats and 20,000+ Bosniaks) were caused by the Chetniks, 24,000 by the Ustaše (17,000 Croats and 7,000 Bosniaks), 16,000 by the Partisans (14,000 Croats and 2,000 Bosniaks), 11,000 by German forces (7,000 Croats and 4,000 Bosniaks), 8,000 by Italian forces (5,000 Croats and 3,000 Bosniaks), while 12,000 died abroad (10,000 Croats and 2,000 Bosniaks).

Individual researchers who assert the inevitability of using identification of casualties and fatalities by individual names have raised serious objections to Žerjavić's calculations/estimates of human losses by using standard statistical methods and consolidation of data from various sources, pointing out that such an approach is insufficient and unreliable in determining the number and character of casualties and fatalities, as well as the affiliation of the perpetrators of the crimes.

In Croatia, the Commission for the Identification of War and Post-War Victims of the Second World War was active from 1991 until the Seventh Government of the republic, under Prime Minister Ivica Račan ended the commission in 2002. In the 2000s, concealed mass grave commissions were established in both Slovenia and Serbia to document and excavate mass graves from the Second World War.

=== German casualties ===
According to German casualty lists quoted by The Times for 30 July 1945, from documents found amongst the personal effects of General Hermann Reinecke, head of the Public Relations Department of the German High Command, total German casualties in the Balkans amounted to 24,000 killed and 12,000 missing, no figure being mentioned for wounded. A majority of these casualties suffered in the Balkans were inflicted in Yugoslavia. According to German researcher Rüdiger Overmans, German losses in the Balkans were more than three times higher: 103,693 during the course of the war, and some 11,000 who died as Yugoslav prisoners of war.

=== Italian casualties ===
The Italians incurred 30,531 casualties during their occupation of Yugoslavia (9,065 killed, 15,160 wounded, 6,306 missing). The ratio of dead/missing men to wounded men was uncommonly high, as Yugoslav partisans would often murder prisoners. Their highest losses were in Bosnia and Herzegovina: 12,394. In Croatia the total was 10,472 and in Montenegro 4,999. Dalmatia was less bellicose: 1,773. The quietest area was Slovenia, where the Italians incurred 893 casualties. An additional 10,090 Italians died post-armistice, either killed during Operation Achse or after joining Yugoslav partisans.

== See also ==
- Adriatic Campaign of World War II
- Allied bombing of Yugoslavia in World War II
- Museum of 4 July
- Liberation Front of the Slovenian People
- Uprising in Serbia (1941)
- Seven anti-Partisan offensives
- Air warfare on the Yugoslav Front
- Yugoslavia and the Allies
- National Liberation War of Macedonia
- Slovene Lands in World War II
- Beisfjord massacre, a prisoner transfer from Yugoslavia that led to Norway's largest massacre
- Russian Protective Corps, a Wehrmacht unit composed of White Russian émigrés from Serbia
- Yugoslav World War II monuments and memorials
