= Friedrich Stahl =

Friedrich Stahl may refer to:

- Friedrich Julius Stahl (1802–1861), German constitutional lawyer, political philosopher and politician
- Friedrich Stahl (1863-1940), German illustrator and painter.
- Friedrich Stahl (officer) (1889–1979), German army officer
- Friedrich Stahl, a fictional character in the German TV soap opera Storm of Love
