= Friedrich Stahl (officer) =

German officer and war criminal (1889–1979)

Albert Gottfried Friedrich Stahl
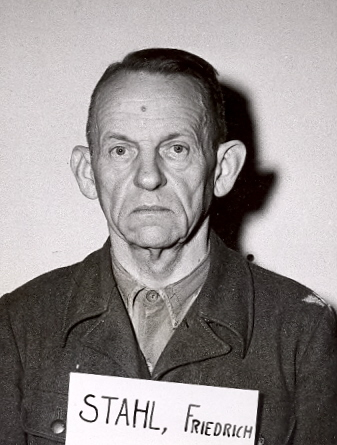
- Friedrich Stahl at Nuremberg trials
- Born: 14 June 1889; Darmstadt, Hesse, German Empire
- Died: 19 December 1979 (aged 90); West Germany
- Military career
- Allegiance: Prussia; Nazi Germany
- Branch: Prussian Army; German Army
- Service years: 1909–1945
- Rank: Generalleutnant
- Commands: 714th Infantry Division
- Conflicts: World War I World War II

Albert Gottfried Friedrich Stahl (14 June 1889 – 19 December 1979) was a German officer in the army of Nazi Germany. He rose to the rank of Generalleutnant and he commanded the 714th Infantry Division between 2 May 1941 and 31 December 1942.

== Biography ==
Stahl was born on 14 June 1889 in Darmstadt. In 1909, he joined the Prussian Army, and on 14 September 1914 he was awarded with Iron Cross of 2nd class. He fought in World War I for the German Empire.

Stahl was a Regimentskommandeur during the Nazi invasion of Poland. Later, during the Battle of France he was appointed to the staff of the 16th Army. In June 1942, he was sent to the Balkans as commander of the 714th Infantry Division in order to conduct anti-Partisan operations, in which captured Partisans were killed after questioning. He led the Kozara Offensive, a counter-insurgency operation which severely damaged Partisan forces.

In 1945, he was taken as a prisoner of war by the US army. He was questioned at the Nuremberg trials as a witness.

Military offices
| Preceded by none | Commander of 714. Infanterie-Division; 2 May 1941 – 31 December 1942 | Succeeded by Generalleutnant Josef Reichert |
