= Monument to the Revolution =

Monument to the Revolution may refer to:

- Monument to the Revolution (Kozara), a 1972 World War II memorial sculpture by Dušan Džamonja
- Monument to the Revolution of the people of Moslavina, a 1967 World War II memorial sculpture by Dušan Džamonja
- Monument to the Revolution of 1905, a monument in Tallinn, Estonia
- Monument to the Revolution of 1905 (Matveev Kurgan), a monument in Taganrog, Russia
- Monumento a la Revolución, a monument in Mexico City
- Monument to the Revolution, in Zona Rosa (San Salvador)
