= Kostanjevac =

Kostanjevac may refer to:

- Kostanjevac, Bjelovar-Bilogora County, a village near Berek, Croatia
- Kostanjevac, Zagreb County, a village in the municipality of Žumberak, Croatia

== See also ==
- Kostanjevec (disambiguation)
- Kostanjevica (disambiguation)
