= Kozara Offensive =

1942 battle in northwestern Bosnia

- Part of World War II in Yugoslavia
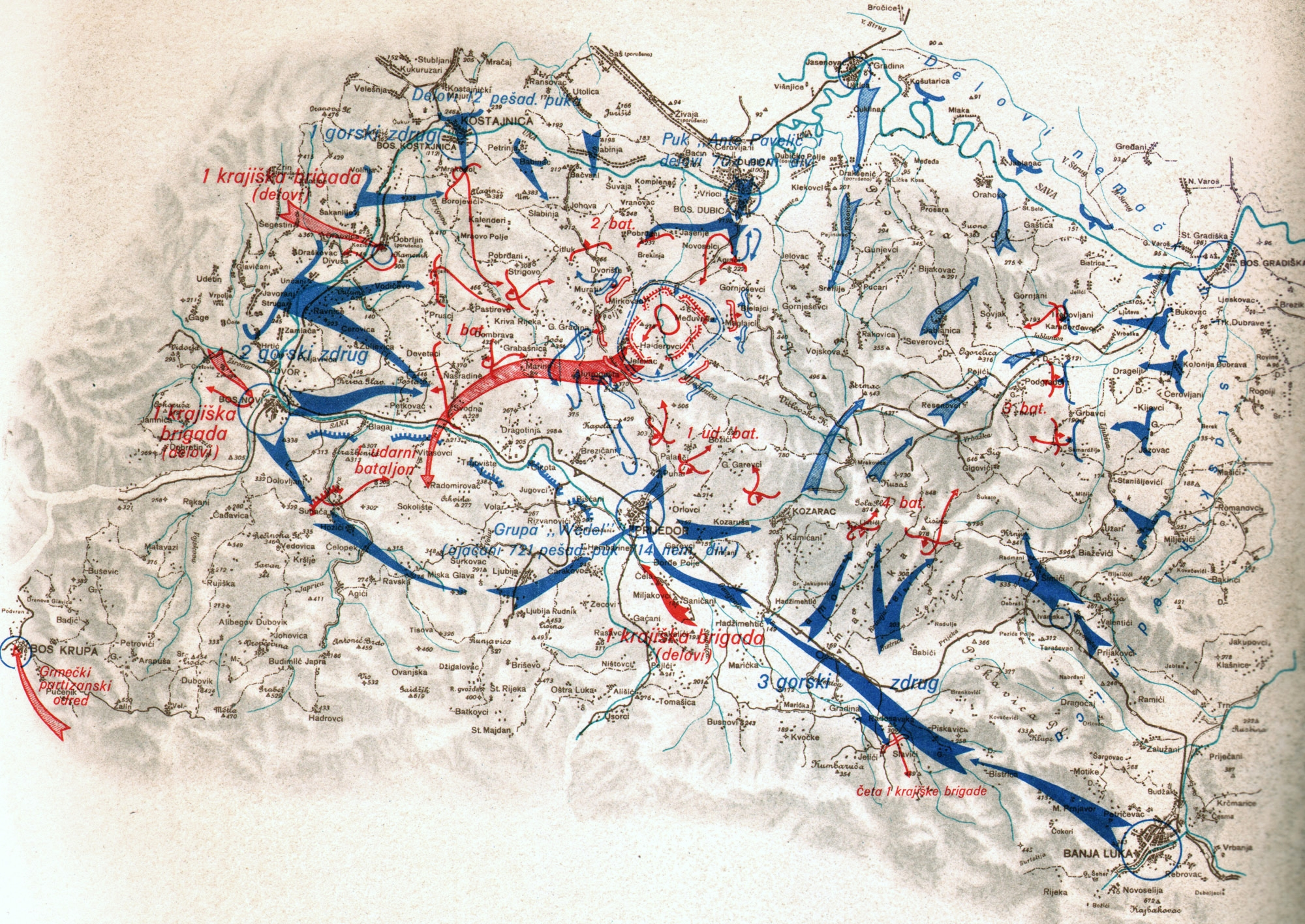
- Map of Axis movements during the operation
Date	10 June – 17 July 1942
Location	Kozara, near Prijedor, Independent State of Croatia (modern-day Bosnia and Herzegovina)
Result	Axis victory: Partisan retreat with heavy casualties; Sympathizing civilians massacred during or after the battle

Belligerents
Axis and collaborationist forces: Germany; Independent State of Croatia; Chetniks	Yugoslav Partisans

Commanders and leaders
(Nazi Germany) Friedrich Stahl (Nazi Germany) Kurt Waldheim (Independent State of Croatia) Vjekoslav Luburić (Independent State of Croatia) Jure Francetić (Chetniks) Rade Radić	(Yugoslav Partisans) Obrad Stišović

Units involved
(Nazi Germany) Wehrmacht; 704th Infantry Division; 714th Infantry Division; Independent State of Croatia; Black Legion; Home Guard; Chetniks; Radić Division	Yugoslav Partisans; 1st Krajina Detachment; 2nd Krajina Detachment; 1st Shock Battalion

Strength
15,000 German troops 22,000 NDH forces 2,000 Chetnik troops	Around 3,500 Partisan troops

Casualties and losses
7,000 casualties	2,000 casualties
- More than 25,000 to 60,000 pro-Partisan Serb civilians massacred in Kozara or sent to concentration camps

The Kozara Offensive (Serbo-Croatian: Kozaračka ofenziva/ofanziva), also known as Operation West Bosnia (German: Operation West-Bosnien) was a large-scale German-led counter-insurgency operation against the Yugoslav Partisans in the Bosnian mountain region of Kozara in the Independent State of Croatia during World War II. It was launched on 10 June 1942, with the goal to encircle and destroy the Partisans who were operating in the Kozara mountain region near Banja Luka, which threatened German access to the Belgrade-Zagreb railway.

The offensive was a coup de main operation, which utilized direct action by elements of the Wehrmacht, Home Guard and Ustaše. Poorly equipped and outnumbered, the Partisans were nearly annihilated during the fight, with only a few hundred partisans narrowly escaping as the German-NDH forces recaptured the area, including the city of Prijedor. The Germans and their allies encircled the main group and achieved their objectives after nearly 40 days of bloody combat, with heavy casualties on both sides.

The Kozara Offensive became a part of national mythology in post-war Yugoslavia, which honored the bravery and martyrdom of the Partisans. It also earned a reputation as German and NDH forces massacred Serb civilians as the battle progressed. Most of the civilians were killed during or after the battle. Others were sent to concentration camps such as Jasenovac, Stara Gradiška, Sajmište, or forced labor mines in German occupied Norway, where many perished.

== Background ==
Yugoslavia was invaded by the Axis powers of Nazi Germany, Fascist Italy, Hungary and Bulgaria on 6 April 1941. On 17 April, the Yugoslav army surrendered after a short campaign. Afterwards, a pro-Axis puppet state in modern-day Croatia, Bosnia and Herzegovina and parts of Serbia called the Independent State of Croatia (Serbo-Croatian: Nezavisna Država Hrvatska or NDH) was established, led by dictator Ante Pavelić. His Ustaše militias became infamous for their sadistic actions against the Serb, Roma, and Jewish populations within the region. One of the policies the NDH had was to annihilate the Serb population through forced assimilation, deportations, and massacres.

Within the occupied Yugoslav territories and in the NDH, armed resistance broke out almost immediately as the Ustaše violence grew. While initial resistance lacked a centralized leadership and was not strictly aligned with any ideology, two main groups eventually grew in size and importance, the Serbian royalist Chetniks led by Draža Mihailović and the multi-ethnic communist Partisans led by Josip Broz Tito. Both groups initially collaborated against the Axis, however differing policies and moral codes eventually led to a guerrilla war between the two movements. While the Partisans were anti-Axis, the Chetniks began extensively collaborating with Italian, German and NDH forces around mid-1942.

In April 1942, the Partisans in northern Bosnia liberated Bosanski Petrovac, Drvar, Glamoč, and Prijedor. The Ustaše commander Vjekoslav Luburić sent out a plan for a "security belt" around the river Sava and gave orders to round up the Serb population that was seen as supportive of the Partisans. Upon realizing this, whole villages deserted to the Partisans divisions hiding in the mountain of Kozara. This was reported by the Ustaše on 8 April 1942, "Jablanac: the inhabitants of the Orthodox faith moved with all their possessions to Orahova village. The five Catholic families moved to the village of Mlaka.”

== Planning ==
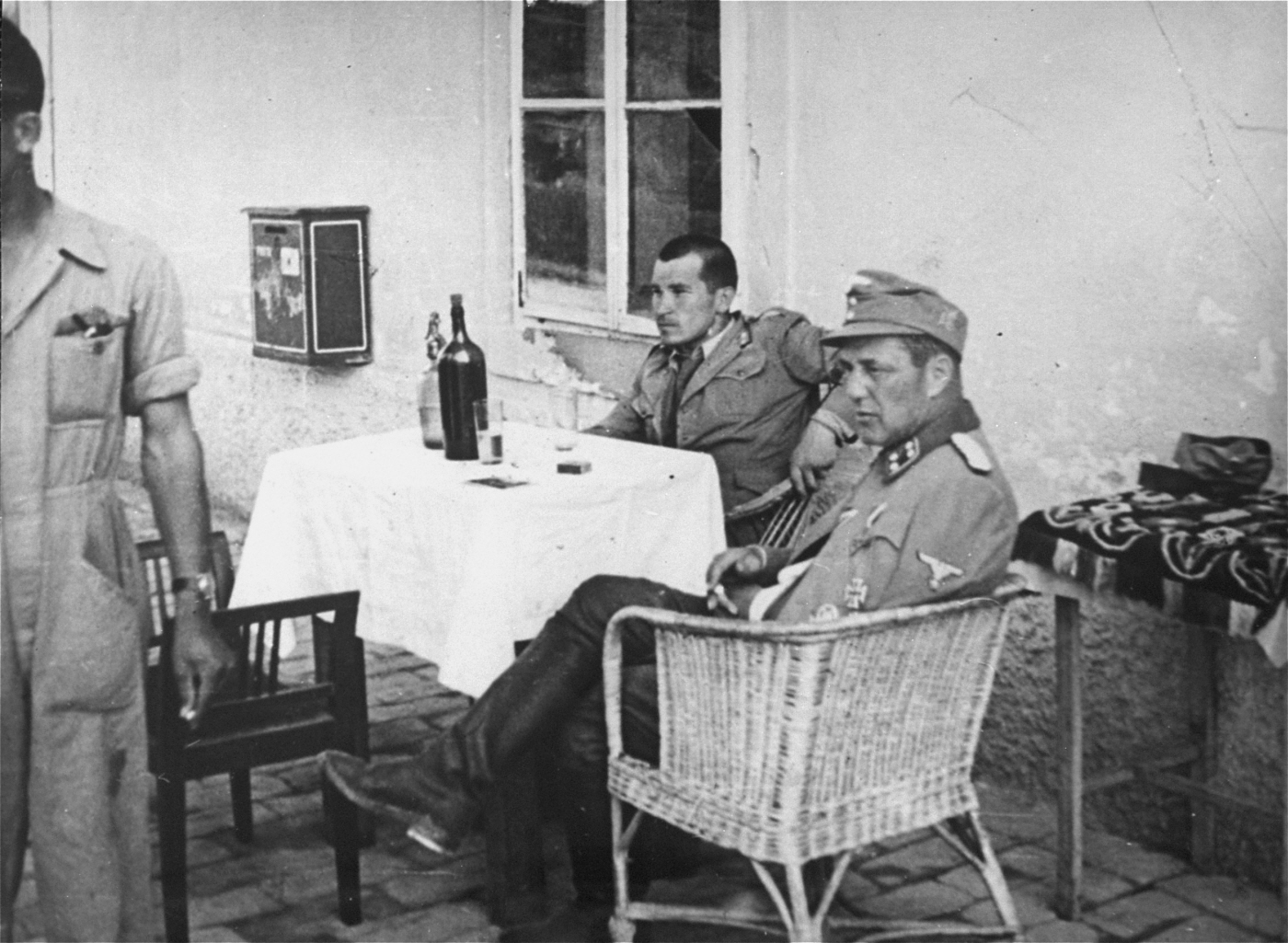
Ustaše commander Vjekoslav Luburić and a German Major during a visit to Stara Gradiška concentration camp at the time of the Kozara Offensive, June 1942

A military operation was planned beginning in May 1942 to eliminate any Partisan influence and round up the Serb population now seen as supportive of the communist Partisans. The Germans and NDH were concerned that their next move would be capturing Banja Luka which would disrupt German weapon transports in the Belgrade-Zagreb railway. The future Secretary General of the United Nations and President of Austria Kurt Waldheim was involved in the planning and implementation. His involvement and tenure in Yugoslavia during World War II would later draw international notoriety.

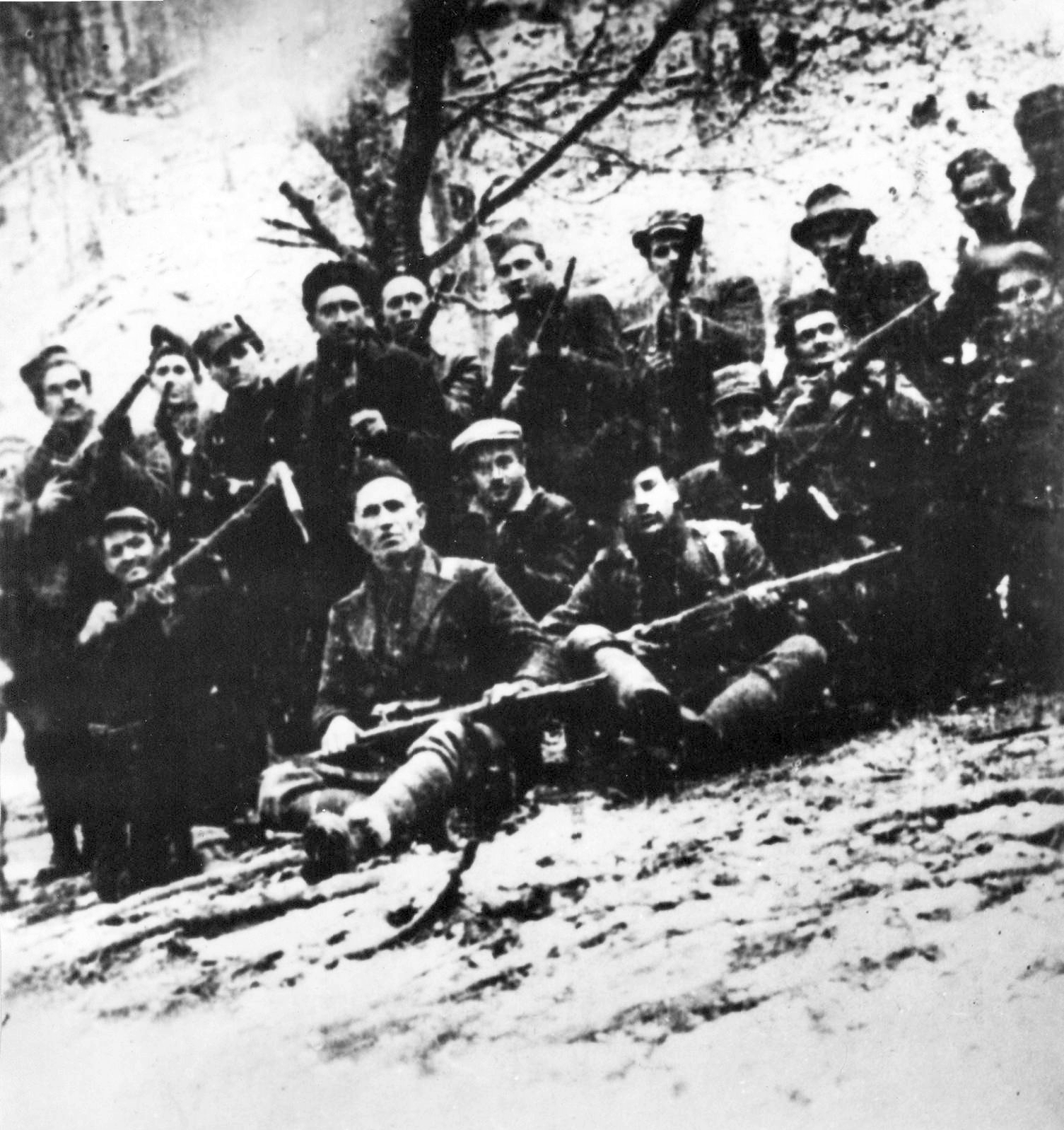
Group of Yugoslav Partisans of the 2nd Krajina National Liberation Partisan Detachment (also known as the Kozara Partisan Detachment), early 1942

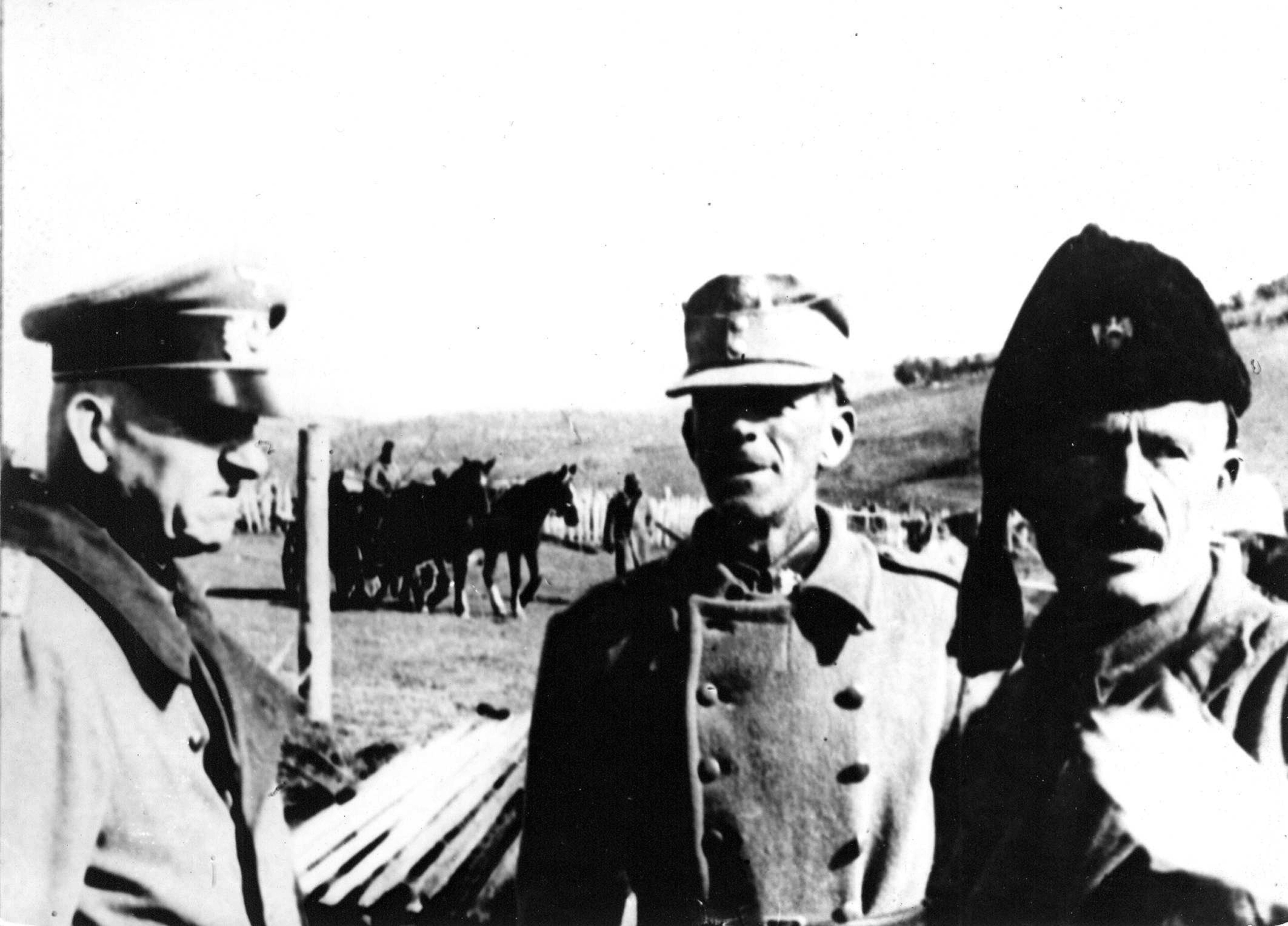
Generallieutenant Friedrich Stahl, an Ustaše commander, and vojvoda Rade Radić in central Bosnia, June 1942

Kampfgruppe West-Bosnien had around 39,000 soldiers under the command of Generalleutnant Friedrich Stahl. The German Wehrmacht had 15,000 soldiers from the 704th and 714th Infantry Divisions, while the Ustaše and Home Guard engaged 22,000 alongside elements of the 1st Ustaše Regiment of the Black Legion. 2,000 Chetnik soldiers under the command of vojvoda Rade Radić would also participate in this battle. Radić previously fought alongside the Partisans but would later grow disillusioned with their ideology. In April 1942, he formed his own Chetnik division and staged a coup at a hospital near Banja Luka, killing several Partisans including physician Mladen Stojanović. The Partisans had only around 3,500 soldiers, consisting of men from the 2nd Krajina Detachment, with elements of the 3rd and 4th battalions of the 1st Detachment. Despite these setbacks, the men were well trained as many were foreign Republican veterans of the Spanish Civil War.

== Battle ==
The operation commenced on 10 June shortly after 4:30 am. The Germans were able to catch the exhausted Partisans by surprise and managed to capture Prijedor and the mines of Ljubjina, which were under danger of falling into enemy hands. Many Serb civilians fled to the mountains to seek sanctuary with the Partisans. The Germans and Croatian armies quickly encircled the Partisans. On June 17 the encirclement was completed after eight days of fighting, although the Domobran forces would suffer heavy losses, mostly from inexperienced soldiers.

The 2nd Krajina Detachment began plans for a break out. On 26 June, reinforcements from the 704th German Division to lay siege on the encircled Partisans and the 1st Krajina Detachment was ambushed during a break out attempt. The situation was becoming increasingly dire and chaotic. Many Partisans were killed or wounded, and the Headquarters Detachment made the decision to break out on the night of 3 and 4 July. The preparations were hastily arranged and many wounded Partisans were left behind as a result.

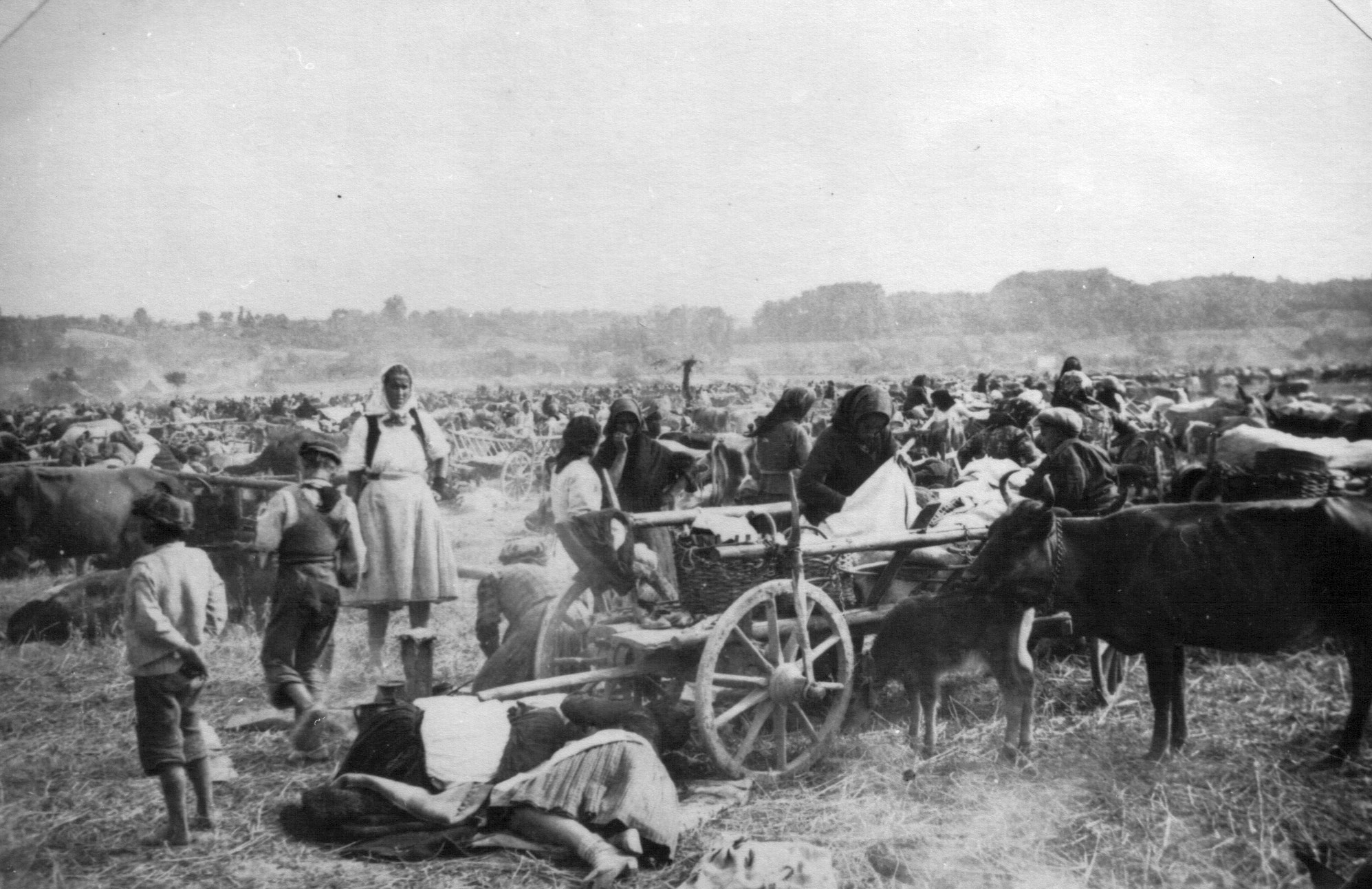
Serb villagers taking refuge in the mountain of Kozara, mid 1942

The breakthrough started as planned after midnight on 4 July. The 2nd Detachment came across German soldiers, who pushed them back. Fighting continued until morning, culminating in the 1st Shock Battalion narrowly escaping destruction with 11,000 civilians also fleeing. Another break out attempt was made, but with no success. German tanks reinforced the defense and only small pockets were able to escape. After 38 days of bloody fighting, the main group of Partisans was destroyed.

== Aftermath ==
Estimates of casualties range at around 9,000 to 10,000 soldiers killed or wounded on both sides. The Germans and their allies suffered 7,000 killed while the Partisans only lost around 1,700 to 2,000 soldiers. The 1st and 2nd Krajina Detachments were completely annihilated, with only 900 Partisans being able to break out and they formed the 5th Krajina Brigade which fought around the region until war's end.

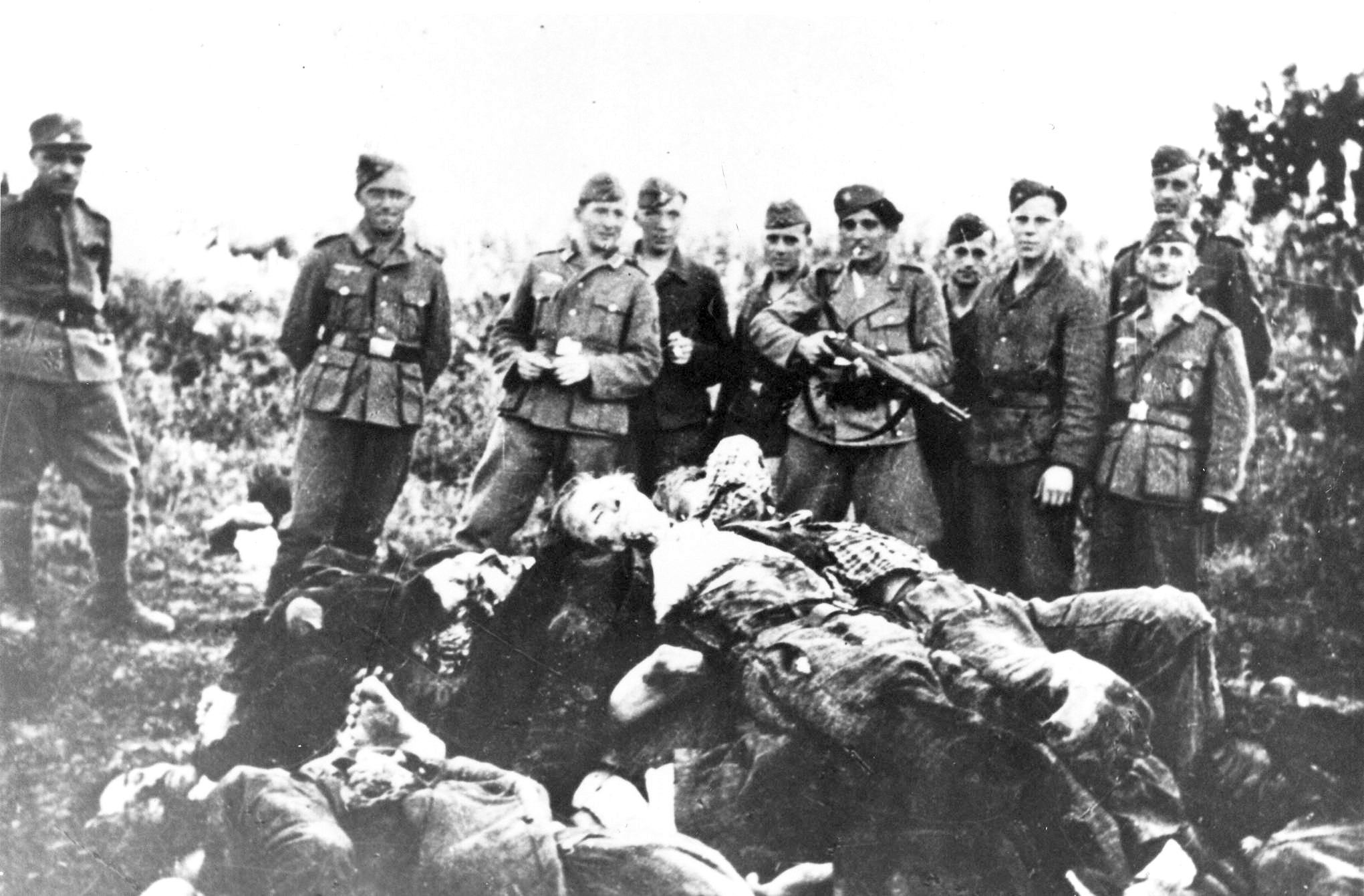
Germans and Ustaše posing with the corpses of slaughtered Serbs in Kozara, June 1942

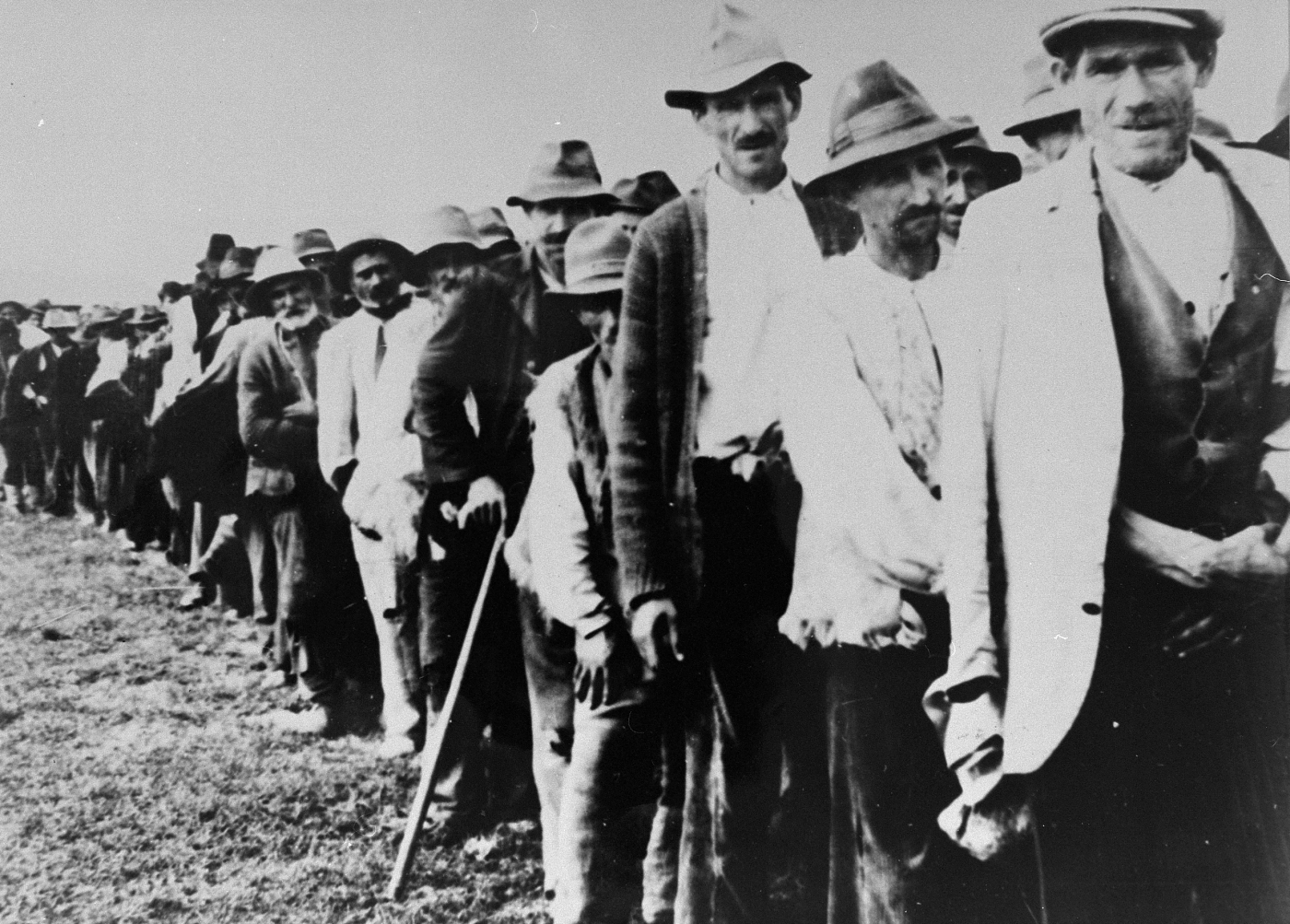
Serbs and Roma from the Kozara region deported to the Jasenovac concentration camp

The Kozara Offensive became a part of national mythology in post-war Yugoslavia, which honored the bravery and martyrdom of the Partisans and people caught in the crossfire. In retaliation, the German and NDH forces began massacring Serb civilians and Partisans who were unable to escape. Large number of Serbs were killed on the spot, women and children were deported to the Jasenovac or Stara Gradiška concentration camps where many subsequently died. Male prisoners were taken to the Nazi Sajmište concentration camp near Zemun in Belgrade or to forced labor mines in German occupied Norway from which few returned. It is estimated that around 25,000 to 60,000 pro-Partisan Kozara Serbs were murdered by the Germans and Ustaše militias. Partisan activities resumed in the region after the Axis forces withdrew in September 1942. A statue called the Monument to the Revolution was erected in honor of those who fell during the battle of Kozara in 1972, by sculptor Dušan Džamonja. Unlike most anti-fascist monuments in the country, it escaped vandalism and destruction during the Bosnian War. The only pieces stolen were several stone panels listing several entities. After the war, a Serbian Orthodox cross was installed in the amphitheater entrance. The site is well maintained and continues to be a popular attraction with many annual festivals, commemorations and remembrance events held there today.

== See also ==
- Kozara
- Kozara (film), a Yugoslav film made in 1962
- Kozara National Park
- Monument to the Revolution
