= Kostanjevec (disambiguation) =

Kostanjevec is a village near Slovenska Bistrica, Slovenia.

Kostanjevec may also refer to:

- Kostanjevec Podvrški, a village near Samobor, Croatia
- Kostanjevec Riječki, a village near Gornja Rijeka, Croatia

== See also ==
- Kostanjevac (disambiguation)
- Kostanjevica (disambiguation)
