= Krivaja =

Krivaja may refer to the following locations:

== Bosnia and Herzegovina ==
=== Villages ===
- Krivaja (Cazin), a village in the municipality of Cazin, Federation of Bosnia and Herzegovina
- Krivaja (Zavidovići), a village in the municipality of Zavidovići, Federation of Bosnia and Herzegovina
- Krivaja (Prijedor), a village in the municipality of Prijedor, Republika Srpska

=== Rivers ===
- Krivaja (Bosna), a river in Federation of Bosnia and Herzegovina, tributary of Bosna
- Krivaja (Velika Usora), a river in Republika Srpska, tributary of Velika Usora

== Croatia ==
=== Villages ===
- Krivaja, Berek, a village in the municipality of Berek

== Serbia ==
=== Villages ===
- Krivaja (Bačka Topola), a village in the municipality of Bačka Topola, Vojvodina
- Krivaja (Šabac), a village in the municipality of Šabac
- Krivaja (Blace), a village in the municipality of Blace
- Krivaja (Sjenica), a village in the municipality of Sjenica

=== Rivers ===
- Krivaja (Great Bačka Canal), a river in Vojvodina, tributary of Great Bačka Canal
- Krivaja (Đetinja), a river in Central Serbia, tributary of Đetinja

=== Other ===
- Krivaja (lake), a lake near Bačka Topola, Vojvodina
- Krivaja (fortress), fortress not far from Šabac, Central Serbia

== See also ==
- Krivaja Vojnićka, a village in the municipality of Vojnić, Croatia
- Operation Krivaja '95
