= Moslavina =

Microregion in Croatia

Coordinates: 45°34′11″N 16°43′43″E

- Geographic region^{a}
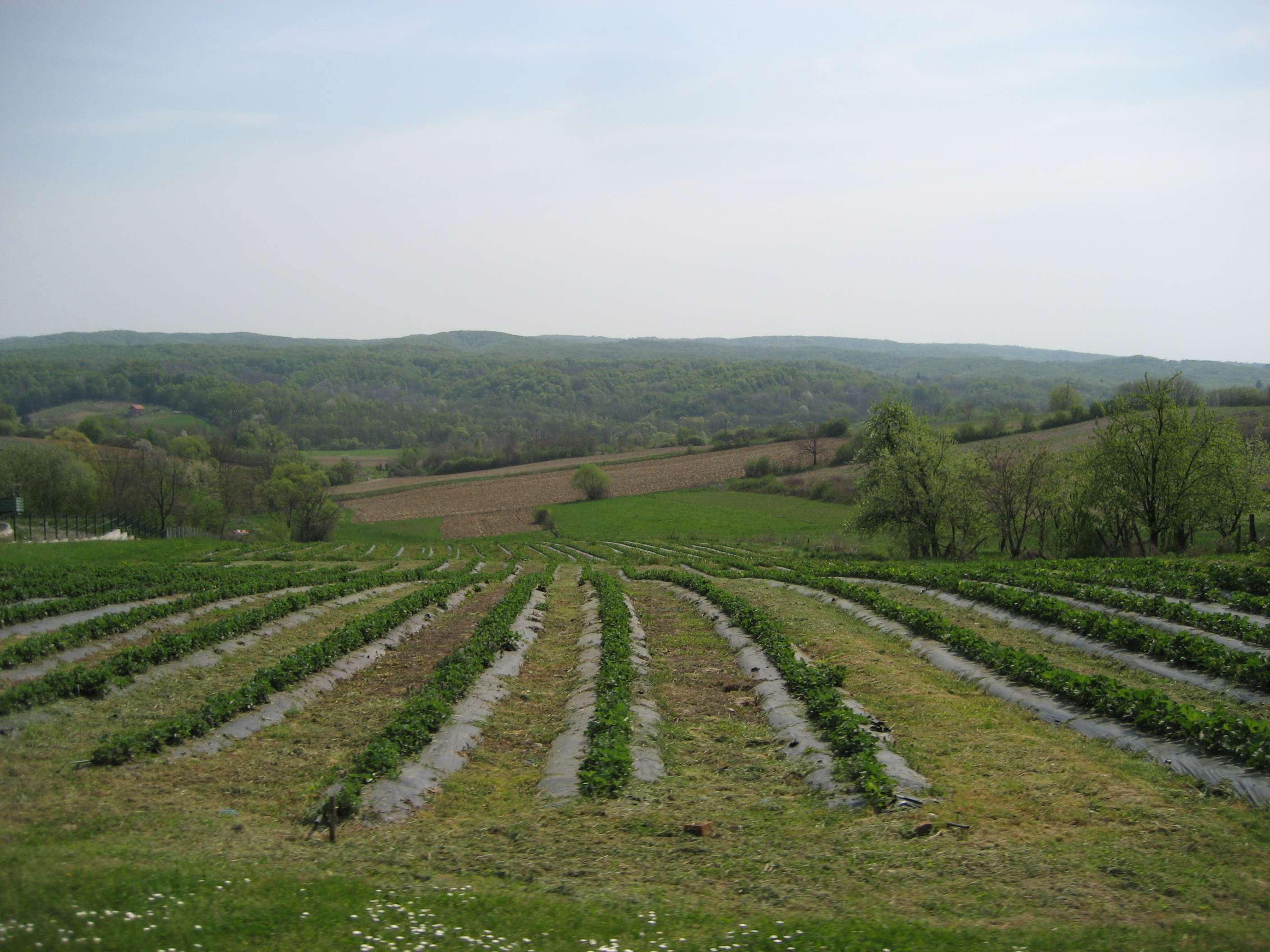
- Slopes of Moslavačka gora at Vrtlinska
- Etymology: Croatian: Moslavina; Hungarian: Monoszló
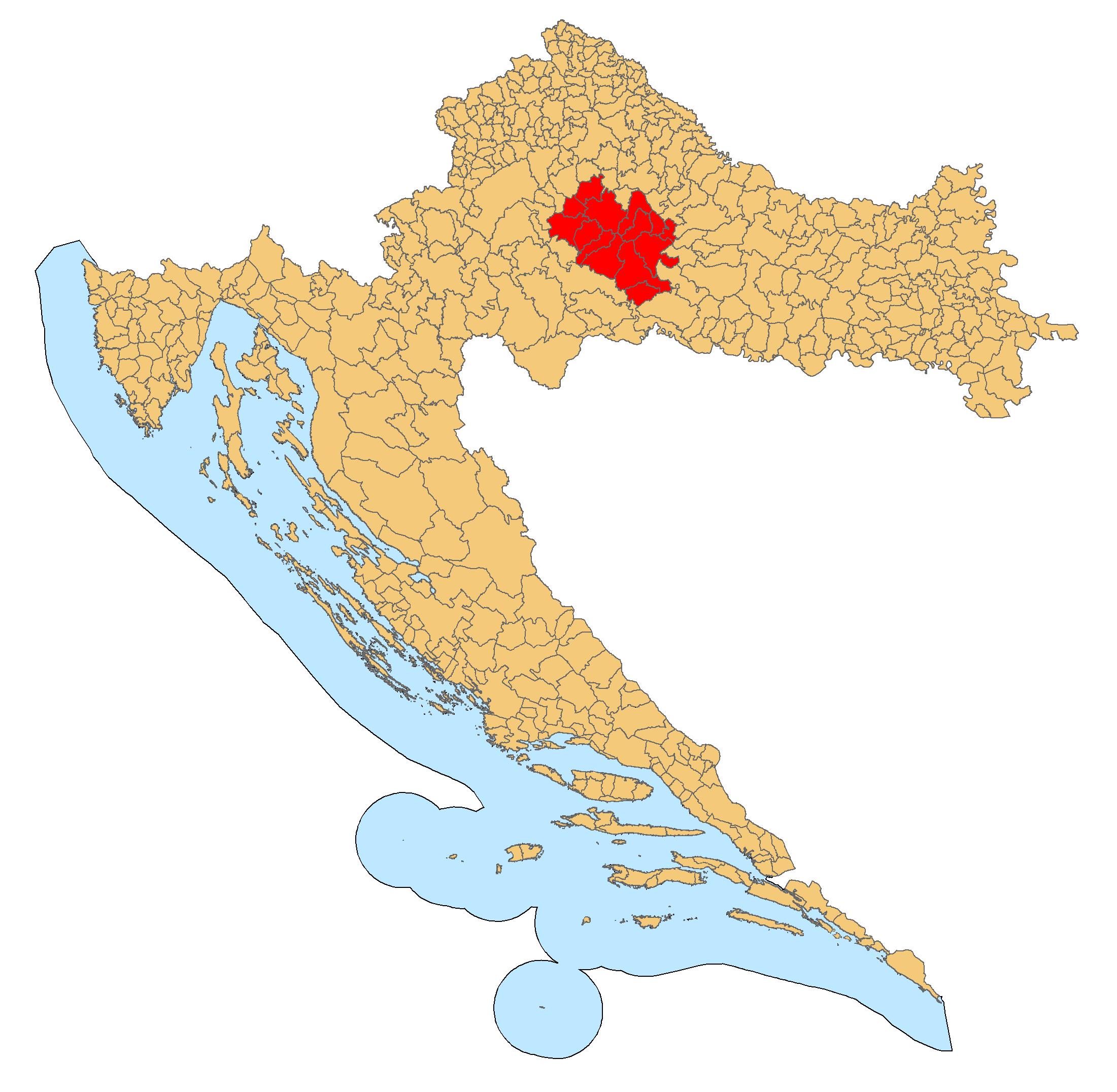
- Moslavina on a map of Croatia colored in red.
- Interactive map of Moslavina
- Country: Croatia
- Traditional capital: Kutina

Population (2021)^{c}
  - Total: 84 204
- ^{a} Moslavina is not designated as an official region, it is a geographic region only.

Moslavina (Croatian pronunciation: [mǒslaʋina]), also known as Monoszló in Hungarian, is a microregion in Croatia centered on the central mountain of Moslavačka gora. It is administratively divided by the counties of Zagreb, Sisak-Moslavina and Bjelovar-Bilogora. The main city in the region in terms of traffic, commerce and business is the city of Kutina (central Moslavina), with 24,000 citizens. Other important centres are Ivanić-Grad (western Moslavina), Čazma, Garešnica and Popovača. Moslavina borders Banovina and Turopolje to the south-west, Kalničko Prigorje and Bilogora to the north and Slavonia to the east.

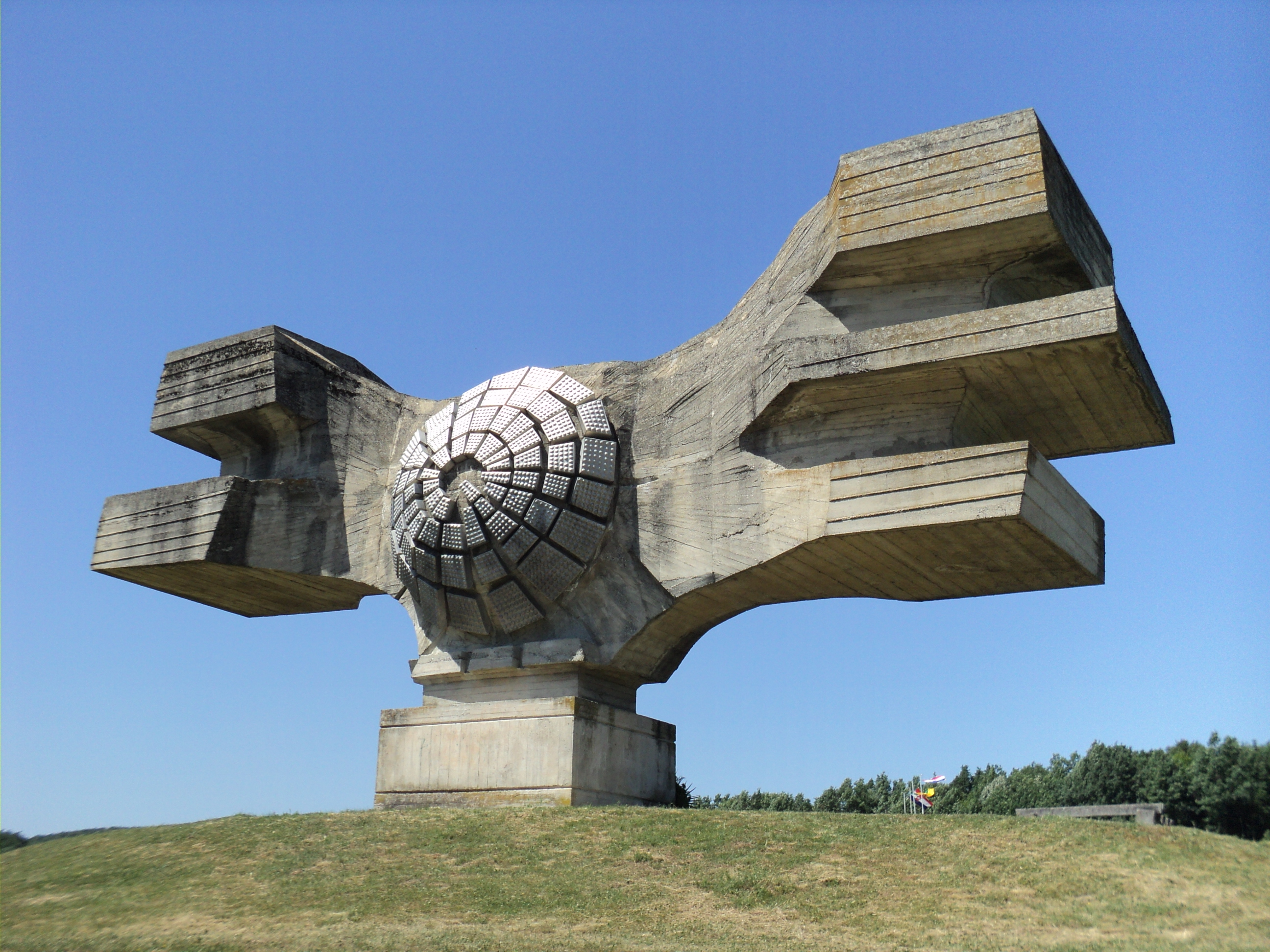
Monument to the Revolution of the people of Moslavina in Podgarić.

The region has a significant amount of natural resources. It also home to part of the nature park Lonjsko Polje, a wetland which is currently under consideration to become a UNESCO World Heritage site. The region is home of the companies Petrokemija and Selk, and over 6,000 people in the area are employed in the electronics industry.

== Name ==
The name originates from the days of the Kingdom of Croatia, coming from the older name of Moslavačka gora; Mons Claudius.

== Territorial division ==
Moslavina as a region is divided by the territorial-political structure of the Republic of Croatia between Zagreb, Bjelovar-Bilogora and Sisak-Moslavina counties. Despite the division, Moslavina has an identity based on common history, customs, culture and the backbone of economic activities, which is geographically defined by the Moslavačka gora mountain and the associated rivers with it as well as the low-lying swamplands of Lonjsko polje.

The following municipalities and towns are considered part of Moslavina:

- Zagreb county
  - Ivanić-Grad
  - Kloštar Ivanić
  - Križ
  - Dubrava
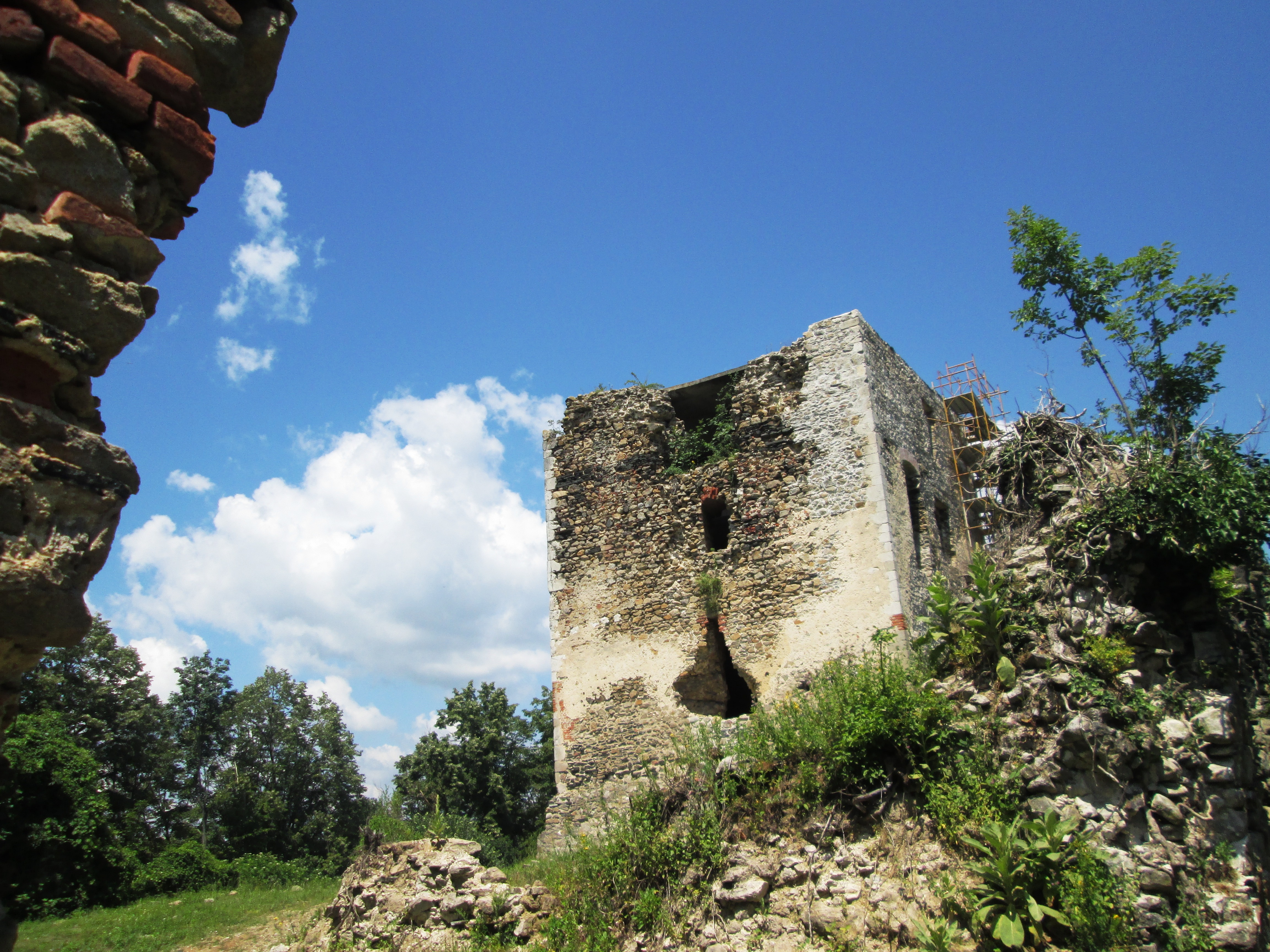
    Garić grad, one of the oldest medieval Croatian fortified cities located in Moslavina.
- Bjelovar-Bilogora county
  - Čazma
  - Garešnica
  - Hercegovac
  - Velika Trnovitica
  - Ivanska
  - Berek
- Sisak-Moslavina county
  - Velika Ludina
  - Popovača
  - Kutina
  - Lipovljani

== See also ==
- Geography of Croatia

== Sources ==
- Moslavina at enciklopedija.hr (in Croatian)
