= Kloštar Ivanić =

- Municipality
- Općina Kloštar Ivanić
- Interactive map of Kloštar Ivanić
- Location of Kloštar Ivanić in Croatia
- Coordinates: 45°44′24″N 16°25′12″E
- Country: Croatia
- Region: Central Croatia
- County: Zagreb County
- Muni. seat: Kloštar Ivanić
- Settlements: 11 settlements: Bešlinec; Čemernica Lonjska; Donja Obreška; Gornja Obreška; Kloštar Ivanić (seat); Krišci; Lipovec Lonjski; Predavec; Sobočani; Stara Marča; Šćapovec

Government
  - Mayor: Željko Filipović (SDP)

Area
  - Municipality: 77.5 km^{2} (29.9 sq mi)
  - Urban: 14.0 km^{2} (5.4 sq mi)

Population (2021)
  - Municipality: 5,523
  - Density: 71.3/km^{2} (185/sq mi)
  - Urban: 3,263
  - Urban density: 233/km^{2} (604/sq mi)
- Time zone: UTC+1 (CET)
  - Summer (DST): UTC+2 (CEST)
- Postal codes: 10312
- Area code: 01
- License plates: ZG
- Website: klostar-ivanic.hr

Kloštar Ivanić is a settlement and the surrounding municipality in central Croatia, located in the Zagreb County, about 50 kilometres southeast of the city of Zagreb and 30 kilometers north of Sisak. According to the 2011 census, there are 6,091 inhabitants in Kloštar Ivanić proper and the surrounding ten villages which make up the municipality, 97.2% of whom are ethnic Croats. The municipality is part of the Moslavina microregion. The nearest town is Ivanić-Grad, only 4 kilometres away.

== Settlements ==
Like most municipalities of Croatia, Kloštar Ivanić is almost entirely rural, consisting of a collection of villages, the largest of which is also called Kloštar Ivanić and which serves as municipal seat. The following is a list of settlements with their populations per the 2011 Croatian census:

- Bešlinec, population 390
- Čemernica Lonjska, population 261
- Donja Obreška, population 130
- Gornja Obreška, population 119
- Kloštar Ivanić, population 3,583
- Krišci, population 211
- Lipovec Lonjski, population 375
- Predavec, population 258
- Sobočani, population 460
- Stara Marča, population 138
- Šćapovec, population 166
