= Monument to the Revolution of the people of Moslavina =

1967 Croatian sculpture by Dušan Džamonja

- Spomenik revoluciji naroda Moslavine (Serbo-Croatian)
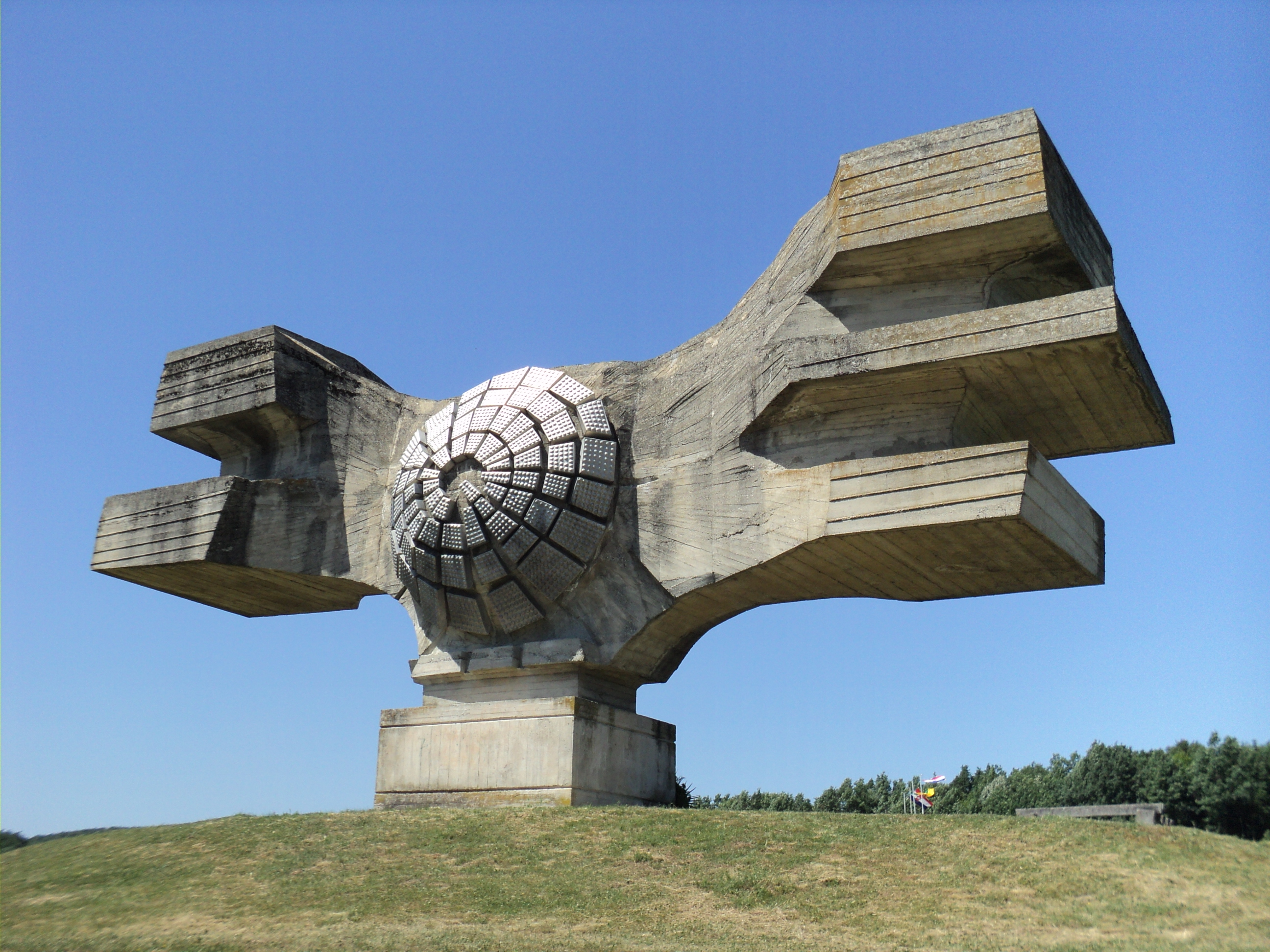
- Artist: Dušan Džamonja
- Year: 1967
- Type: Sculpture
- Location: Podgarić, Berek municipality; 45°38′26.9″N 16°46′40.3″E

Monument to the Revolution of the people of Moslavina or simply Monument to the Revolution (Croatian: Spomenik revoluciji naroda Moslavine or Spomenik revoluciji) is a World War II memorial sculpture by Dušan Džamonja, located in Podgarić, Berek municipality, Croatia. The monument stands about 10 m high and is 20 m long. It is dedicated to the people of Moslavina during World War II.

== Overview ==
The monument is inspired by the Greek mythological goddess of victory Nike. Džamonja built it immersed in the landscape. The metallic structure in the center represents a stylized sun, which is given two asymmetric wings on the sides. The monument was dedicated in 1967 by the president of Yugoslavia, Josip Broz Tito.

== See also ==
- List of Yugoslav World War II monuments and memorials
