= Gornja Garešnica =

- Village
- Location within Croatia
- Coordinates: 45.6584635°N 16.7958401°E
- Country: Croatia
- County: Bjelovar-Bilogora County
- Municipality: Berek

Area
  - Total: 2.7 sq mi (7.0 km^{2})

Population (2021)
  - Total: 118
  - Density: 44/sq mi (17/km^{2})
- Time zone: UTC+1 (CET)
  - Summer (DST): UTC+2 (CEST)

Gornja Garešnica is a village in Berek municipality, Bjelovar-Bilogora County, Croatia. It is connected by the D26 highway.

== Demographics ==
According to the 2021 census, its population was 118.
