= Potok, Berek =

Potok
- Village
- Location within Croatia
- Coordinates: 45.7350738°N 16.8370043°E
- Country: Croatia
- County: Bjelovar-Bilogora County
- Municipality: Berek

Area
  - Total: 0.97 sq mi (2.5 km^{2})

Population (2021)
  - Total: 48
  - Density: 50/sq mi (19/km^{2})
- Time zone: UTC+1 (CET)
  - Summer (DST): UTC+2 (CEST)

Potok is a village in Berek municipality, Bjelovar-Bilogora County, Croatia.

== Demographics ==
According to the 2021 census, its population was 48.
