= Ruškovac =

- Village
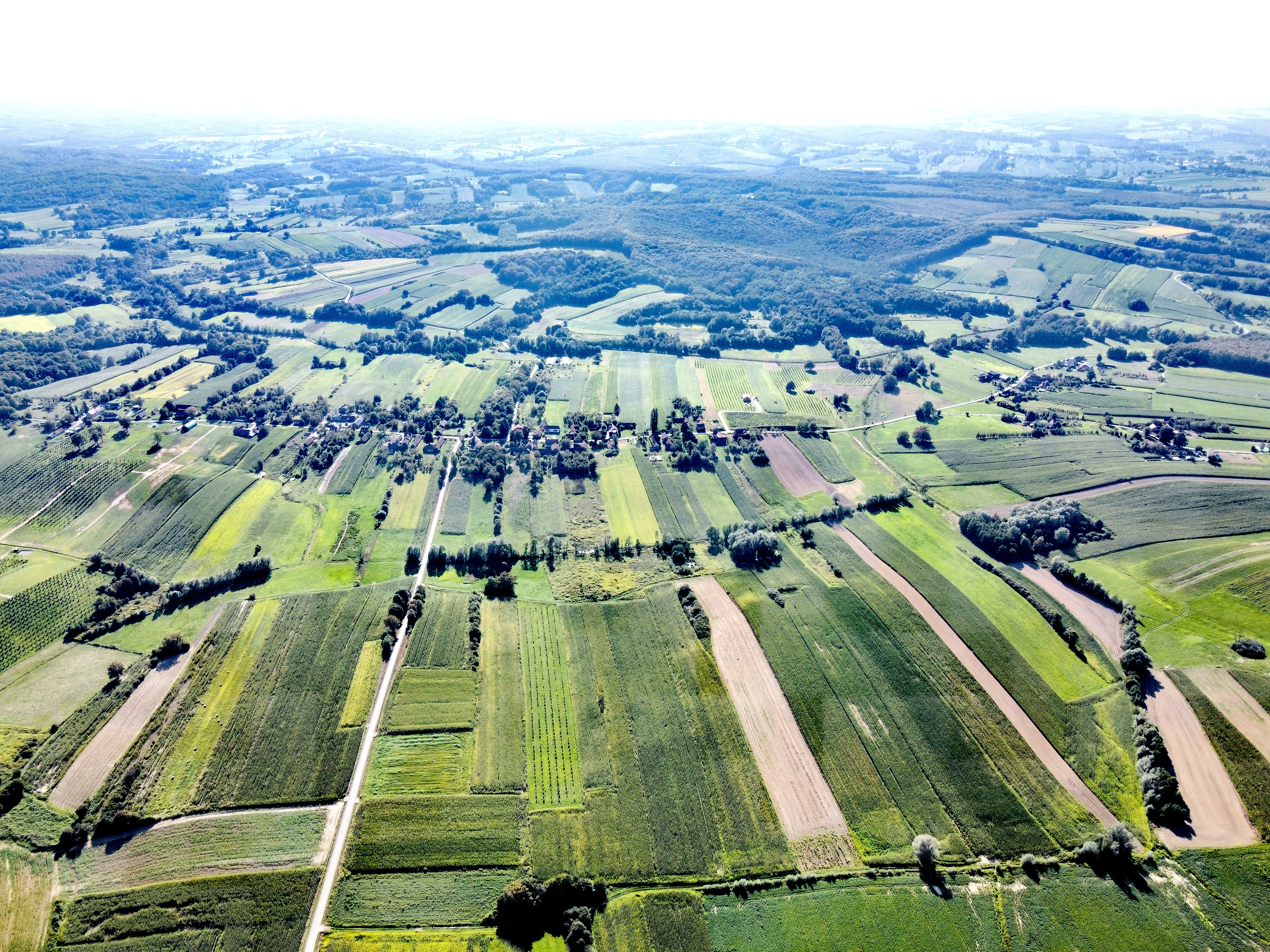

- Location within Croatia
- Coordinates: 45.7169323°N 16.8377547°E
- Country: Croatia
- County: Bjelovar-Bilogora County
- Municipality: Berek

Area
  - Total: 3.2 sq mi (8.4 km^{2})

Population (2021)
  - Total: 78
  - Density: 24/sq mi (9.3/km^{2})
- Time zone: UTC+1 (CET)
  - Summer (DST): UTC+2 (CEST)

Ruškovac is a village in Berek municipality, Bjelovar-Bilogora County, Croatia.

== Demographics ==
According to the 2021 census, its population was 78.
