= Šimljanik =

- Village
- Location within Croatia
- Country: Croatia
- County: Bjelovar-Bilogora County
- Municipality: Berek

Area
  - Total: 9.8 sq mi (25.5 km^{2})

Population (2021)
  - Total: 25
  - Density: 2.5/sq mi (0.98/km^{2})
- Time zone: UTC+1 (CET)
  - Summer (DST): UTC+2 (CEST)

Šimljanik is a village in Croatia. It is connected by the D26 highway.

== Demographics ==
According to the 2021 census, its population was 25.
