= Šimljana =

- Village
- Location within Croatia
- Coordinates: 45.6996658°N 16.7976823°E
- Country: Croatia
- County: Bjelovar-Bilogora County
- Municipality: Berek

Area
  - Total: 2.4 sq mi (6.3 km^{2})

Population (2021)
  - Total: 71
  - Density: 29/sq mi (11/km^{2})
- Time zone: UTC+1 (CET)
  - Summer (DST): UTC+2 (CEST)

Šimljana is a village in Berek municipality, Bjelovar-Bilogora County, Croatia.

== Demographics ==
According to the 2021 census, its population was 71.
