= Begovača =

- Village
- Location within Croatia
- Country: Croatia
- County: Bjelovar-Bilogora County
- Municipality: Berek

Area
  - Total: 3.1 sq mi (8.1 km^{2})

Population (2021)
  - Total: 31
  - Density: 9.9/sq mi (3.8/km^{2})
- Time zone: UTC+1 (CET)
  - Summer (DST): UTC+2 (CEST)

Begovača is a village in Croatia.

== Demographics ==
According to the 2021 census, its population was 31.
