= Regions of Croatia =

Croatia proper Dalmatia Istria Slavonia, Baranya (lighter shade)

Croatia consists of twenty counties, it is traditionally divided into four historical and cultural regions: Croatia proper, Dalmatia, Istria, and Slavonia. These are further divided into variety of smaller regions that serve as historical areas within Croatian territory.

== Regions ==
Coat of arms	Name	Location	Description
Coat of arms of Croatia Proper	Croatia Proper	Map of Croatia proper within Republic of Croatia	The central part of the Republic of Croatia that also holds the capital Zagreb.
Coat of arms of Dalmatia	Dalmatia	Map of Dalmatia	Dalmatia consists of much of the coastline of the Republic of Croatia, and stretches from the island of Rab in the north of the country to the Bay of Kotor in the south. Dubrovnik, one of Croatia's most important tourist cities, is in Dalmatia. The largest city is Split.
Coat of arms of Croatian Istria	Istria	Map of Istria	Istria consists mainly of the Croatian part of the peninsula of Istria. Pula is the largest city in Croatian Istria, and sits at the peninsula's southern tip.
Coat of arms of Slavonia	Slavonia	Map of Slavonia within Republic of Croatia	This region comprises the majority of inland eastern Croatia, and was also once its own kingdom.

== Historic regions ==
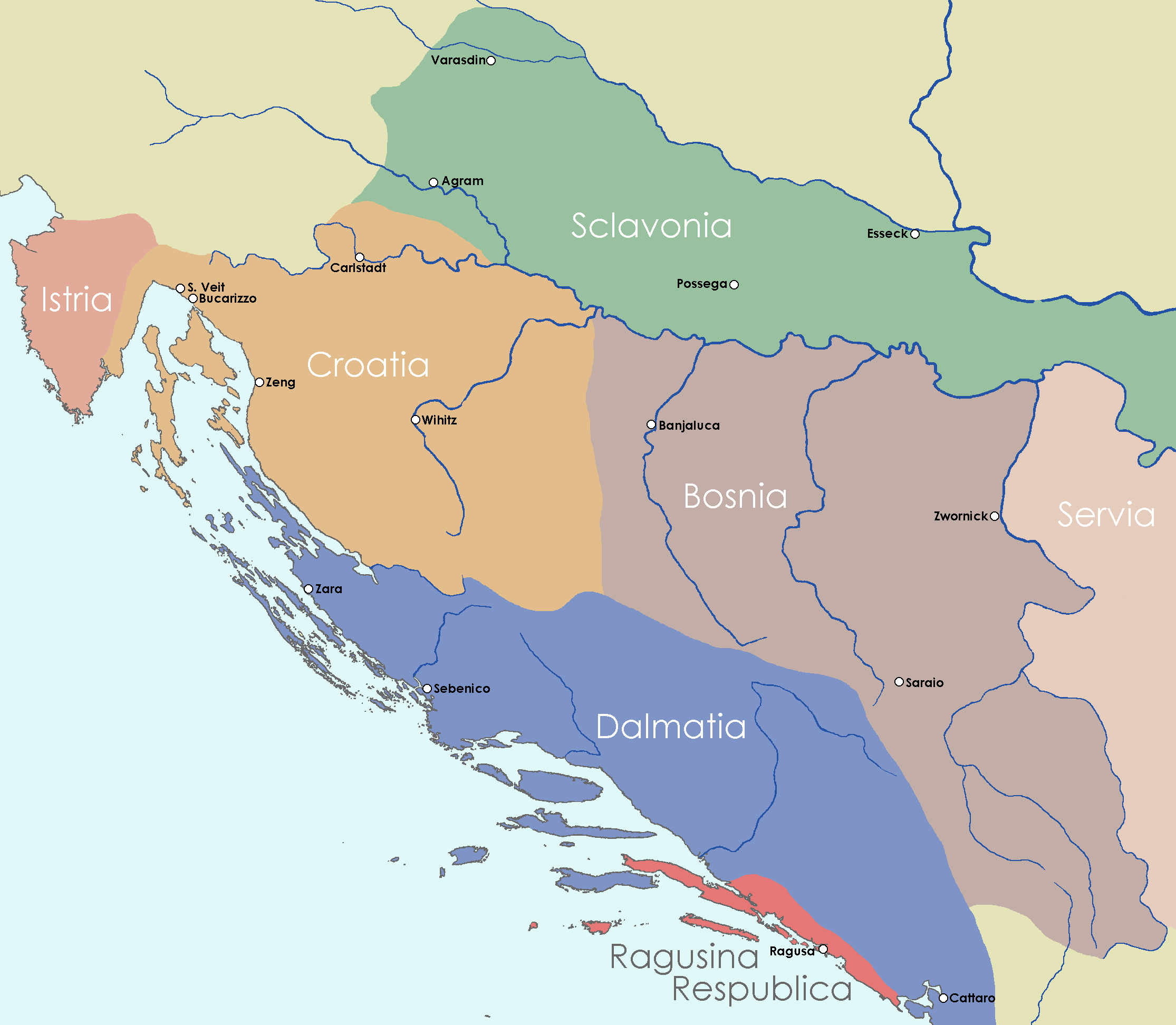
Croatian historical regions according to the map of Matthäus Seutter from 1720 Croatia Dalmatia Sclavonia (Slavonia) Istria Ragusina Respublica (Dubrovnik Republic)

- Banovina (or Banija) is a region in central Croatia, situated between the rivers Sava, Una and Kupa.
- Baranja forms a small enclave between the region of Slavonia and the Republic of Hungary, it lies in the north east of Croatia. The rest of the region known as Baranya is located in Hungary.
- Croatian Littoral (Hrvatsko primorje), the maritime region of Croatia proper
- Gorski kotar occupies the area between the major cities of Karlovac and Rijeka (a.k.a. Fiume). The regions main city is Delnice. The river Kupa separates the region from the Republic of Slovenia in the north.
- Konavle forms a small subregion of Dalmatia in the very south of Croatia and stretches from the town of Cavtat up to the Prevlaka peninsula near Montenegro border.
- Kordun is a region in central Croatia, situated between Lika and Banovina.
- Lika lies at the cross-roads between continental and coastal Croatia. Apart from those that go through narrow region of Gorski Kotar to the north all Croatian roads that lead to the sea from Zagreb pass through Lika. One of Croatia's most famous national parks: the Plitvice Lakes National Park is located in this region.
- Međimurje is a small region in northern Croatia, situated between rivers Mura and Drava.
- Moslavina is a microregion located in the Croatian counties of: Zagreb County, Sisak-Moslavina County and Bjelovar-Bilogora County. Its main cities are Kutina and Ivanić-Grad.
- Podravina is the Croatian region that lies around the river Drava along Croatia's northern border with Hungary.
- Podunavlje lies along the Croato-Serbian border in eastern Slavonia. The border follows the flow of the river Danube (Dunav) giving the region its name.
- Posavina is located around the river Sava that runs through central Croatia and then along the Croato-Bosnian border in southern Slavonia.
- Prigorje, the region around Zagreb, roughly between Žumberak and Moslavina
- Syrmia (or Srijem) is divided between Serbia and Croatia. In Croatia it is in the very east of the country.
- Turopolje, a microregion in the Sava river valley south of Zagreb, with city of Velika Gorica in its center
- Hrvatsko Zagorje ('Croatian Upland', or simply Zagorje) lies to the north of the Croatian capital city, Zagreb. Other major cities include the world-famous archeological site of Krapina and the baroque town of Varaždin. Its northern border is the Republic of Slovenia and the regions of Podravina and Međimurje, to the east lies Slavonia and to the west lies Kordun and Gorski Kotar.
- Dalmatinska Zagora ('Dalmatian Hinterland', or simply Zagora), the hinterland region of Dalmatia
