= Dušan Džamonja =

Croatian sculptor (1928–2009)

- Born: 31 January 1928; Strumica, Kingdom of Yugoslavia
- Died: 14 January 2009 (aged 80); Zagreb, Croatia
- Education: Zagreb Academy of Fine Arts
- Known for: Sculpture
- Movement: Modernism

Dušan Džamonja (Serbian: Душан Џамоња, pronounced [dǔʃan dʒamoɲa]; 31 January 1928 – 14 January 2009) was a Yugoslav sculptor of Serbian ancestry.

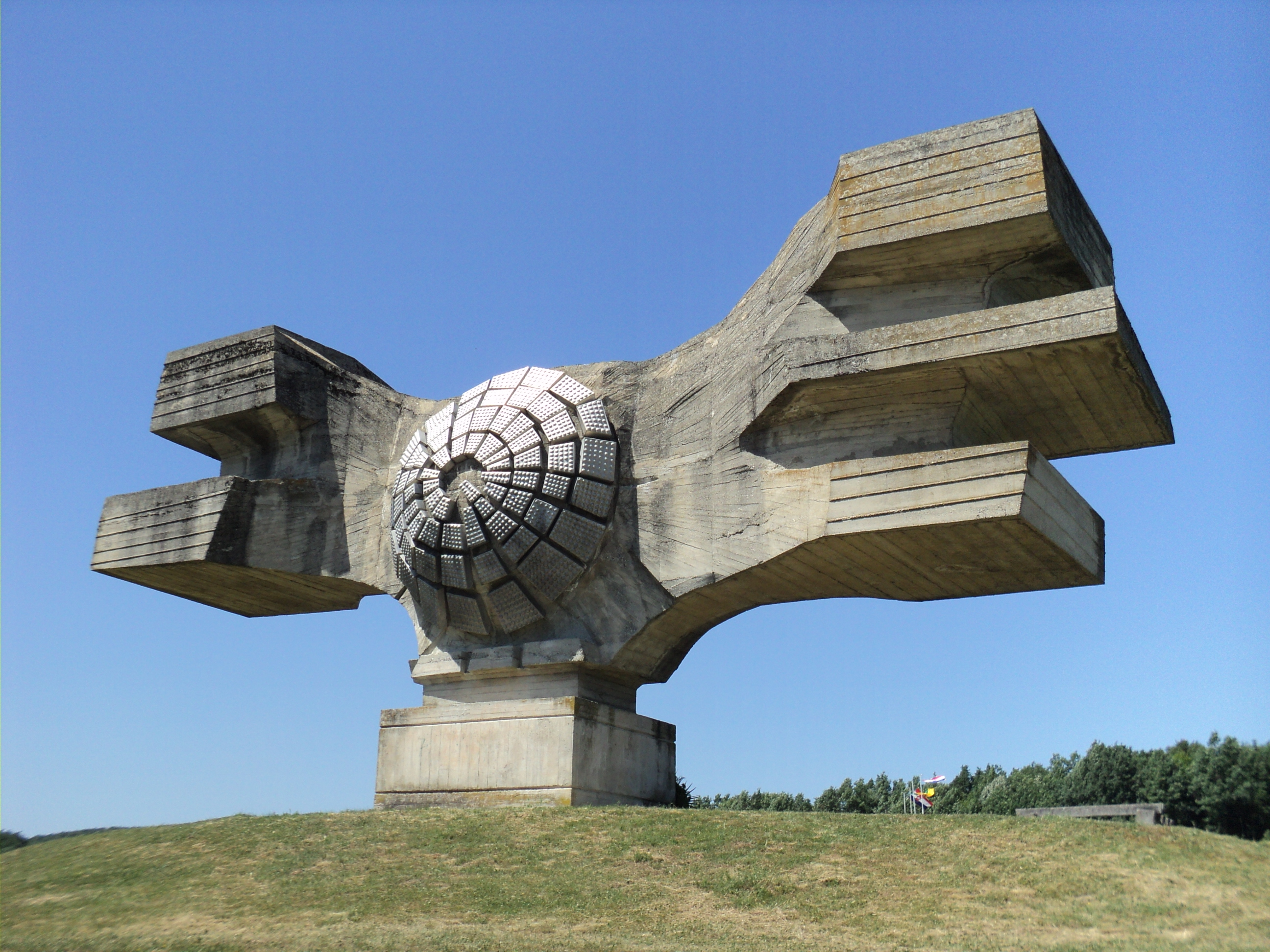
Monument to the Revolution (1967), World War II memorial in Podgarić, Croatia, one of Džamonja's best-known works.

== Education and career ==
Džamonja was born in 1928 in Strumica, Macedonia, former Vardar Banovina, Kingdom of Yugoslavia. In 1945, Džamonja began his studies at the Academy of Fine Arts in Zagreb under the professors Vanja Radauš, Frano Kršinić and Antun Augustinčić, all notable artists. In 1951, he graduated in professor Augustinčić’s master class. He worked in the Kršinić workshop from 1951 until 1953 when he started his workshop in Zagreb.

In 1954 he held his first solo exhibition in the Salon ULUH in Zagreb. In 1970, he began the construction of his house and workshop in Vrsar, Istria according to his own design.

== Artistic style ==
Džamonja drew primarily in chalk and used the technique of washed ink; however, he leaned towards sculpture early on. He used many materials, from bronze and iron to wood, glass, concrete and polyester in his sculptures.

== Works ==
His works are in numerous public and private collections, museums, and galleries in the country and abroad. However, his most notable works are:

- Dušan Džamonja's Park of Sculptures, near Vrsar, is a famous and cultural tourist attraction.
- Monument to the Revolution (1967), World War II memorial in Podgarić, Croatia.

He designed many monumental memorial complexes. These include:

- The Revolution Memorial in Podgarić, Croatia.
- Monument to the Revolution on Mrakovica Mountain, Kozara National Park, Republika Srpska, Bosnia & Herzegovina.
- The Memorial Ossuary to the Fallen Yugoslav Soldiers of the First and Second World Wars in southern Italy, Barletta.

He designed several monuments to the Partisans and victims of concentration camps, most notably the Memorial Ossuary at Barletta, near Ban (completed 1970) and the Monument to the Battle of Kozara (completed 1972).

== Awards and accomplishments ==
He was a recipient of numerous awards and was an academician with both Croatian Academy of Sciences and Arts and Serbian Academy of Sciences and Arts. Below is a list of his awards:

- 1958 Third and Fourth Award for conceptual design for Memorial in Jaijinci, Yugoslavia
- 1959 One of six identical awards on international competition for Monument to the Victims of Dachau, Germany First Award for sculpture, Salon 59, Rijeka, Croatia
- 1960 City of Zagreb Award, Croatia
- 1961 Premio Morgan's Paint, Rimini, Italy First Award for sculpture, First Triennale of Modern Sculpture, Beograd, Yugoslavia
- 1962 Fourth Award, National competition for Monument to Revolution in Slavonija, Kamensko, Croatia
- 1963 Second Award, IV Biennale, San Marino, Italy
- 1965 Gold Medal for artistic activity, Veruchio, Italy
- 1968 Second Award on the competition for Monument to Victims of Fascism in Podhum, Rijeka, Croatia First Award for Memorial Ossuary in Barletta, Italy
- 1970 First Award for Monument to Revolution, Kozara, Bosnia
- 1974 Second Award for design of Memorial Ossuary, Roma, Italy First Award for conceptual design for Memorial to Victory and Fallen Fighters, Sremski Front 1944–45, Yugoslavia
- 1977 Rembrandt Prize, Goethe Stiftung zu Basel, Switzerland
- 1980 Second Award for conceptual design for Monument to Edvard Kardelj, Ljubljana, Slovenia
- 1982 Second Award for National Competition for the Monument in Jajinci, Beograd, Yugoslavia
- 1983 Third Award, Terceiro Biennale der Europäischen Grafik, Baden-Baden, Germany 1986 Award of the Jury, Biennale of Original Drawing, Rijeka, Croatia
- 1990 Second Prize for the design of the Monument on Rhein - Main - Donau Kanal, Germany
