= Oštri Zid =

- Village
- Location within Croatia
- Coordinates: 45.6689428°N 16.7791842°E
- Country: Croatia
- County: Bjelovar-Bilogora County
- Municipality: Berek

Area
  - Total: 3.6 sq mi (9.4 km^{2})

Population (2021)
  - Total: 80
  - Density: 22/sq mi (8.5/km^{2})
- Time zone: UTC+1 (CET)
  - Summer (DST): UTC+2 (CEST)

Oštri Zid is a village in Berek municipality, Bjelovar-Bilogora County, Croatia.

== Demographics ==
According to the 2021 census, its population was 80.
