= Monument to the Revolution (Kozara) =

World War II memorial in Bosnia

Coordinates: 45°00′45″N 16°54′40″E

- Spomenik Revoluciji (Serbo-Croatian)
- Artist: Dušan Džamonja
- Year: 1972
- Type: Sculpture
- Dimensions: 33 m (1,300 in)
- Location: Mrakovica, Kozara

Monument to the Revolution (Serbo-Croatian: Spomenik Revoluciji) is a World War II memorial sculpture by Dušan Džamonja, located at Mrakovica, one of the highest peaks of Kozara mountain, Bosnia and Herzegovina. It is dedicated to the fierce battle and 2,500 Yugoslav partisan fighters and 68,500 predominantly Serb civilians killed or deported to Ustaše concentration camps during the German-Ustaše-Hungarian-Chetnik Kozara Offensive from June to July 1942.

The initiative for the monument's construction began in 1969 and Dušan Džamonja won the first prize for his project. Construction of the monument was completed in 1972.

Džamonja himself described the monument as an interplay of light and darkness; this cylindrical-shaped monument is composed of twenty vertical segments, each being characterized by deep-set concrete pillars (positives) and hollows (negatives). While negatives symbolize death, positives represent victory and life. Horizontally-positioned concrete blocks symbolize enemy forces who are trying to destroy life and victory but are unsuccessful.

Other parts of the memorial complex include a museum and the memorial wall with the names of 9,921 Yugoslav partisans killed in battles on Kozara during World War II in Yugoslavia.

== See also ==
- Battle of Kozara
- List of World War II monuments and memorials in Bosnia and Herzegovina
