= Šimljanica =

- Village
- Location within Croatia
- Coordinates: 45.7088752°N 16.8275379°E
- Country: Croatia
- County: Bjelovar-Bilogora County
- Municipality: Berek

Area
  - Total: 2.8 sq mi (7.2 km^{2})

Population (2021)
  - Total: 84
  - Density: 30/sq mi (12/km^{2})
- Time zone: UTC+1 (CET)
  - Summer (DST): UTC+2 (CEST)

Šimljanica is a village in Berek municipality, Bjelovar-Bilogora County, Croatia.

== Demographics ==
According to the 2021 census, its population was 84.
