= Novo Selo Garešničko =

- Village
- Location within Croatia
- Coordinates: 45.6460865°N 16.7713136°E
- Country: Croatia
- County: Bjelovar-Bilogora County
- Municipality: Berek

Area
  - Total: 1.1 sq mi (2.8 km^{2})

Population (2021)
  - Total: 26
  - Density: 24/sq mi (9.3/km^{2})
- Time zone: UTC+1 (CET)
  - Summer (DST): UTC+2 (CEST)

Novo Selo Garešničko is a village in Berek municipality, Bjelovar-Bilogora County, Croatia. The etymology of the village comes from Slavic languages meaning new village, Novo Selo.

== Demographics ==
According to the 2021 census, its population was 26.
