= Prigorje =

Geographical subregion around Zagreb, Croatia

- Geographic region^{a}
- Etymology: Croatian: prigorje, lit. 'land by the hills'
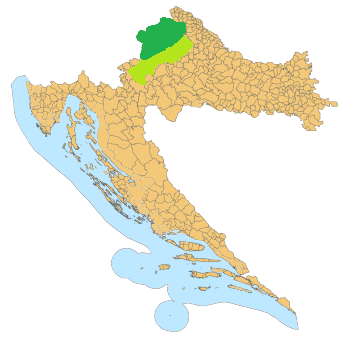
- Prigorje (lime green) and neighbouring Zagorje region (dark green).
- Country: Croatia
- Traditional capital: Sveti Ivan Zelina
- Largest city: Zagreb
- ^{a} Prigorje is not designated as an official region, it is a geographic region only.

Prigorje (pronounced [prǐgorje]) is a geographical subdivision of Croatia, the region around its capital Zagreb, which stretches along the southern slope of Medvednica mountain (colloquially known as "Zagreb's mountain") roughly between Žumberak mountain range and Moslavina region. The term literally means 'land by the mountain(s), foothills'.
