= Kostanjevac, Bjelovar-Bilogora County =

Kostanjevac
- Village
- Location within Croatia
- Coordinates: 45.6822786°N 16.8449008°E
- Country: Croatia
- County: Bjelovar-Bilogora County
- Municipality: Berek

Area
  - Total: 6.3 sq mi (16.4 km^{2})

Population (2021)
  - Total: 87
  - Density: 14/sq mi (5.3/km^{2})
- Time zone: UTC+1 (CET)
  - Summer (DST): UTC+2 (CEST)

Kostanjevac is a village in Berek municipality, Bjelovar-Bilogora County, Croatia.

== Demographics ==
According to the 2021 census, its population was 87.
