= Kozara =

Mountain range in Bosnia and Herzegovina

- Козара
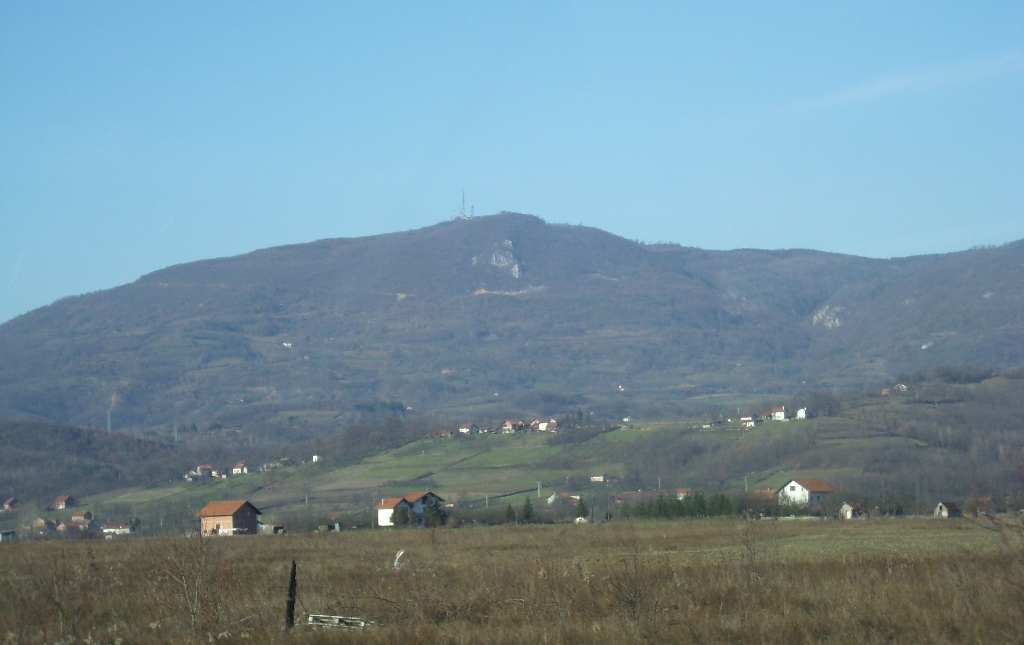
- View of the tallest peak, Lisina

Highest point
- Elevation: 977 m (3,205 ft)
- Coordinates: 44°58′15″N 16°58′39″E

Geography
- Location within Bosnia and Herzegovina
- Location: Kozarac, Bosnia and Herzegovina
- Parent range: Pannonian island mountains

Kozara (Serbian Cyrillic: Козара) is a mountain in western Bosnia and Herzegovina, in the town of Kozarac and in the Bosanska Krajina region, bounded by the Sava River to the north, the Vrbas to the east, the Sana to the south, and the Una to the west. Its tallest peak is Lisina (978 m). In 1942 Kozara was the site of the Kozara Offensive, part of the Yugoslav National Liberation War and Partisan resistance during World War II.

== Peaks ==
Name	Height (m)
Lisina	977
Gola planina	876
Mrakovica	806
Glavuša	793
Bešića poljana	784
Talavića poljana	780
Jarčevica	740
Vrnovačka glava	719
Benkovac-Jurišina kosa	705
Zečiji kamen	667
Kozarački kamen	659
Šupljikovac	652
Vitlovska kosa	589
Palež	542
Mednjak	440

== Gallery ==
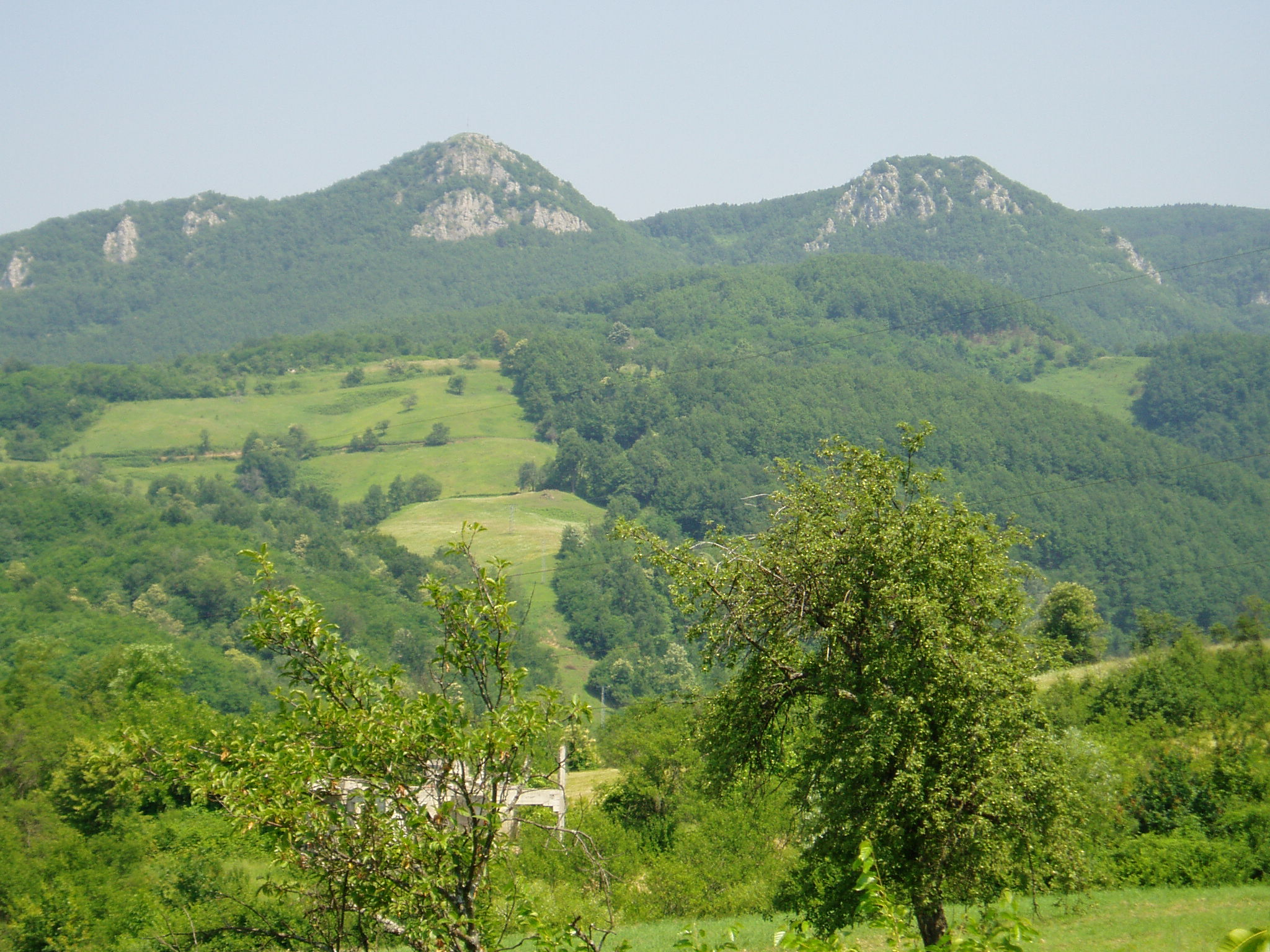
Side of the mountain called 'Kozarački kamen' - overlooking hamlet of Kozarac

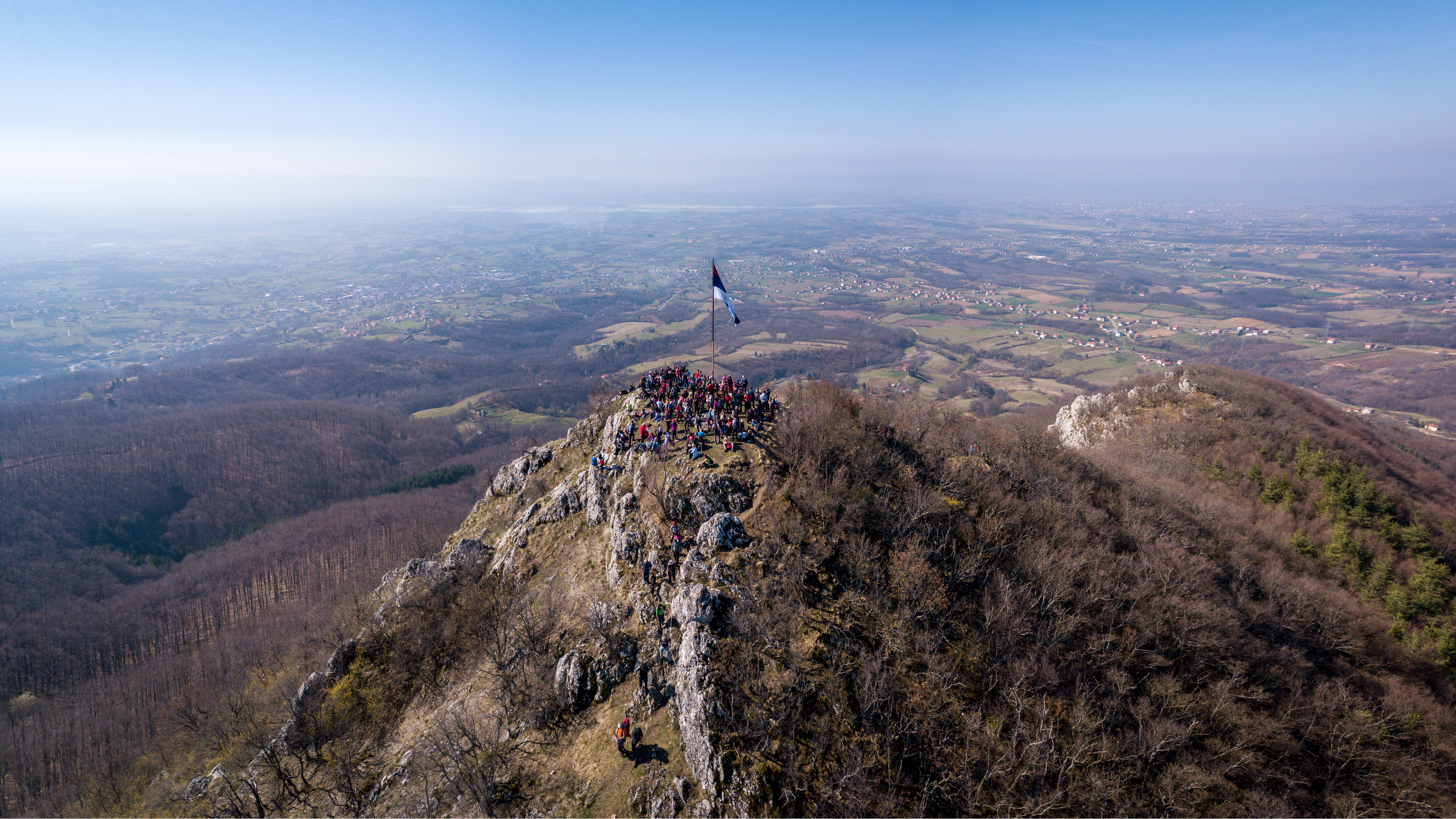
Kozarački kamen

== See also ==
- Kozara National Park
- List of mountains in Bosnia and Herzegovina
