= Krivaja, Berek =

Krivaja
- Village
- Location within Croatia
- Coordinates: 45.7135351°N 16.8040476°E
- Country: Croatia
- County: Bjelovar-Bilogora County
- Municipality: Berek

Area
  - Total: 1.0 sq mi (2.7 km^{2})

Population (2021)
  - Total: 37
  - Density: 35/sq mi (14/km^{2})
- Time zone: UTC+1 (CET)
  - Summer (DST): UTC+2 (CEST)

Krivaja is a village in Berek municipality, Bjelovar-Bilogora County, Croatia.

== Demographics ==
According to the 2021 census, its population was 37.
