= Monument to the Revolution of 1905 (Matveev Kurgan) =

Monument "In commemoration of the 1905 Revolution"
- Russian: Памятник "В память о революции 1905 года"
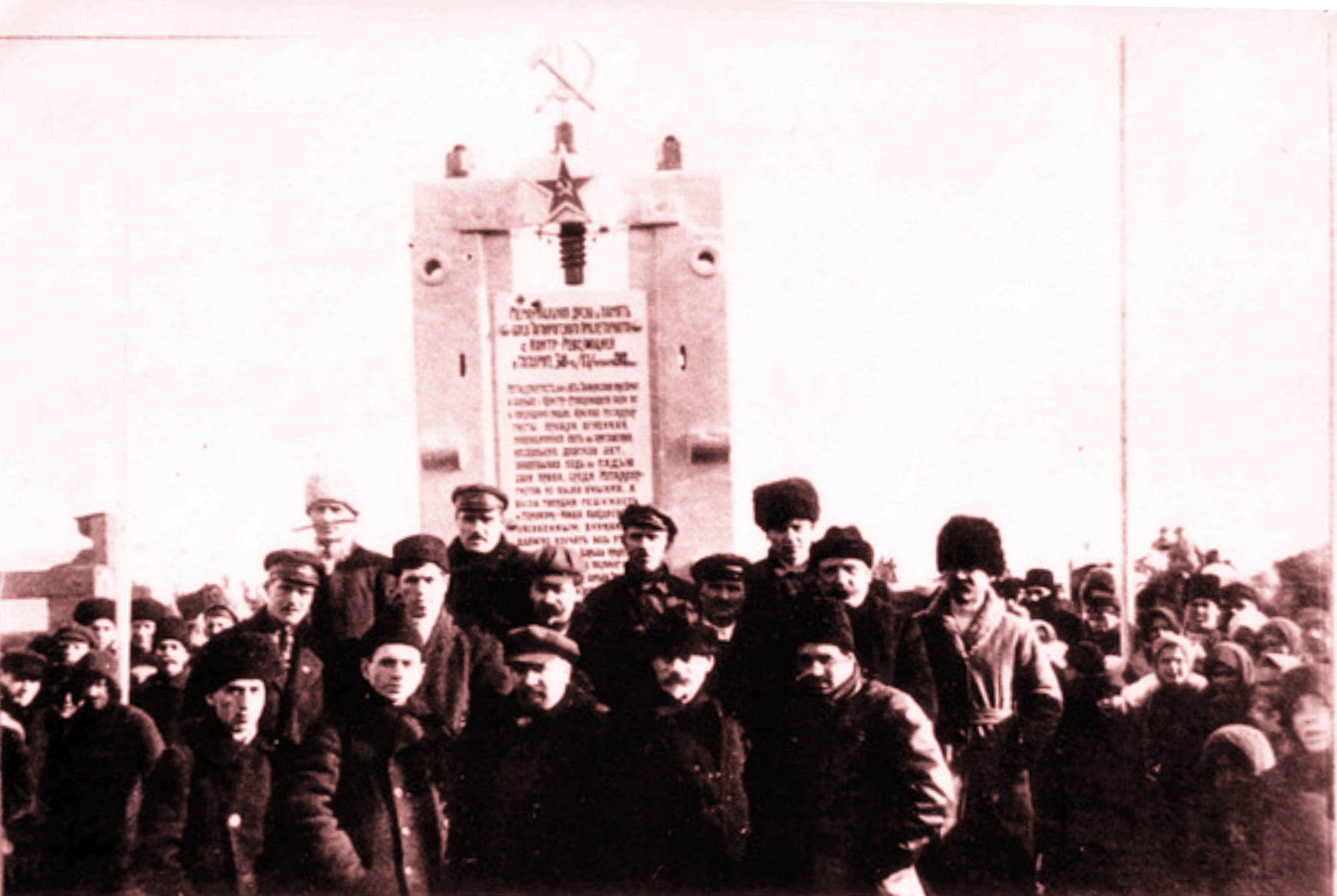
- Interactive map of Monument "In commemoration of the 1905 Revolution"
- Location: Osipenko str.Taganrog, Rostov Oblast, Russia
- Opening date: 1926

Monument "In commemoration of the 1905 Revolution" (Russian: Памятник «В память о революции 1905 года») is a monument in Taganrog. It is located at the intersection of Zavodskaya street and the street P.E. Osipenko. The history monument is registered in "Objects of cultural heritage of the Russian Federation".

The monument is a cage of an old stack-rolling assembly installed on a low stone pedestal. On this cage is a memorial plaque with the inscription: "On 17 December 1905, there was an armed collision of workers of the metallurgical and boiler works with the police".

== History ==
The monument was opened on 30 December 1926. There was the commemorative plaque with the text: "A commemorative plaque in commemoration of fights of the Taganrog proletariat with a counterrevolution in Taganrog on 30 (17) January1918". This board has been removed during occupation of Taganrog (1941–1943). After the liberation of the city a new board was installed but there was another the text about the events of 1905.

By the decision of Small Council of a Regional Council No. 301 of 18 November 1992 the monument "In commemoration of the 1905 Revolution" has been given the status of the Monument of history. There was the title "The place of collision of workers of the metallurgical and boiler works with the police"".

In the register of objects of cultural heritage of the Russian Federation the monument is registered at number 6101167000.
