= Berek, Croatia =

Berek
- Municipality
- Interactive map of Berek
- Location within Croatia
- Country: Croatia
- County: Bjelovar-Bilogora County

Government
  - Mayor: Mato Tonković (Independent)

Area
  - Municipality: 42.9 sq mi (111.0 km^{2})
  - Urban: 4.5 sq mi (11.7 km^{2})

Population (2021)
  - Municipality: 1,106
  - Density: 25.81/sq mi (9.964/km^{2})
  - Urban: 395
  - Urban density: 87.4/sq mi (33.8/km^{2})
- Time zone: UTC+1 (CET)
  - Summer (DST): UTC+2 (CEST)
- Website: berek.hr

Berek is settlement and a municipality in Bjelovar-Bilogora County, Croatia.

== History ==
In the late 19th and early 20th century, Berek was part of the Bjelovar-Križevci County of the Kingdom of Croatia-Slavonia.

== Demographics ==
According to the 2021 census, the population of the municipality was 1,106 with 395 living in the town proper. There were 1,443 inhabitants in 2011, of which 90% Croats.

The municipality consists of the following 13 settlements:

- Begovača, population 31
- Berek, population 395
- Gornja Garešnica, population 118
- Kostanjevac, population 87
- Krivaja, population 37
- Novo Selo Garešničko, population 26
- Oštri Zid, population 80
- Podgarić, population 26
- Potok, population 48
- Ruškovac, population 78
- Šimljana, population 71
- Šimljanica, population 84
- Šimljanik, population 25
Berek: Population trends 1857–2021
v

population	3021	2987	2862	3754	4337	4311	4405	4960	4736	4695	4256	3273	2557	2057	1706	1443	1106
	1857	1869	1880	1890	1900	1910	1921	1931	1948	1953	1961	1971	1981	1991	2001	2011	2021

Sources: Croatian Bureau of Statistics publications

== Politics ==
=== Minority councils and representatives ===
Directly elected minority councils and representatives are tasked with consulting tasks for the local or regional authorities in which they are advocating for minority rights and interests, integration into public life and participation in the management of local affairs. At the 2023 Croatian national minorities councils and representatives elections Serbs of Croatia fulfilled legal requirements to elect 10 members minority council of the Municipality of Berek but the elections were not organized due to the lack of candidates.
