= Kostanjevica =

Kostanjevica may refer to several places in Slovenia:

- Kostanjevica na Krasu, a settlement in the Municipality of Miren-Kostanjevica
- Kostanjevica na Krki, capital of the Municipality of Kostanjevica na Krki
- Kostanjevica, Šentrupert, a settlement in the Municipality of Šentrupert
- Municipality of Kostanjevica na Krki
- Municipality of Miren-Kostanjevica
