= Podgarić =

- Village
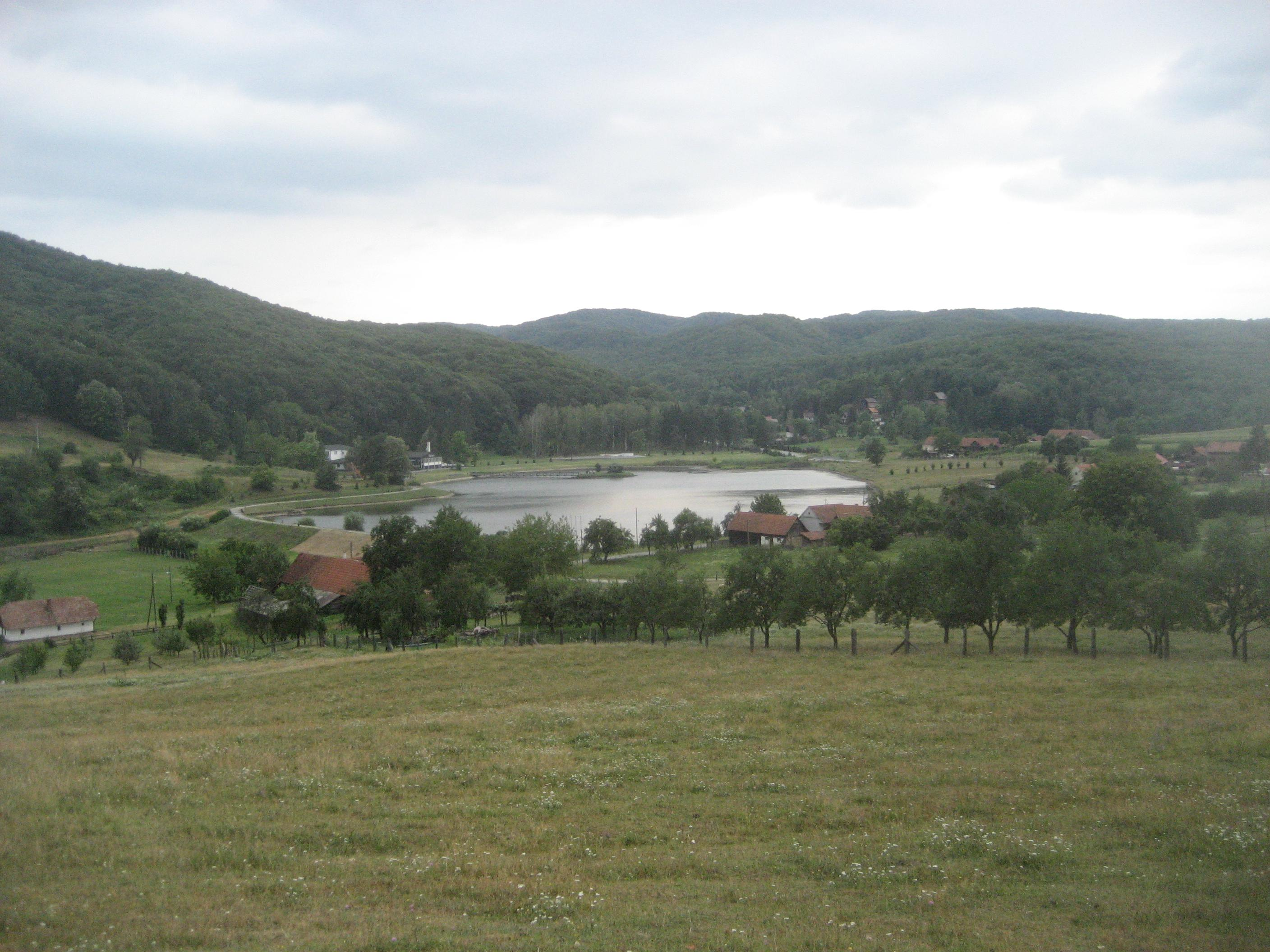

- Location within Croatia
- Coordinates: 45.6442336°N 16.7567612°E
- Country: Croatia
- County: Bjelovar-Bilogora County
- Municipality: Berek

Area
  - Total: 1.2 sq mi (3.1 km^{2})

Population (2021)
  - Total: 26
  - Density: 22/sq mi (8.4/km^{2})
- Time zone: UTC+1 (CET)
  - Summer (DST): UTC+2 (CEST)

Podgarić is a village in Berek municipality, Bjelovar-Bilogora County, Croatia.

== Demographics ==
According to the 2021 census, its population was 26.
