= Ljubija =

Ljubija may refer to:

- Ljubija (town), a small town in the municipality of Prijedor, Bosnia-Herzegovina
- Ljubija (Ljubljanica), a source affluent of the Ljubljanica, a river in Slovenia.
- Ljubljanica, a river in Slovenia, known in the Middle Ages as Ljubija.
- Ljubija, Mozirje, a settlement in the Municipality of Mozirje, Slovenia.
