= Ljubija (town) =

Ljubija Љубија
- Town
- Location within Bosnia and Herzegovina
- Coordinates: 44°55′N 16°37′E
- Country: Bosnia and Herzegovina
- Entity: Republika Srpska
- Municipality: Prijedor

Population (1991)
  - Total: 3,945
- Time zone: UTC+1 (CET)
  - Summer (DST): UTC+2 (CEST)

Ljubija (Serbian Cyrillic: Љубија) is a small town in Bosnia and Herzegovina. It is located in the Bosanska Krajina region in the northwestern part of the country. Administratively, it belongs to the Prijedor municipality.

== History ==
In the 19th century, Ljubija developed into one of the most important locations for the area's economy due to its iron ore deposits. After World War II Ljubija became one of the largest iron mines in the world which employed more than 5,000 people at any one time. Until 1963 it was governed as a separate municipality, before it was merged with Prijedor.

=== Bosnian War ===
On 24–25 July 1992, the Fifth Kozara Brigade and Sixth Krajina Brigade of the Army of Republika Srpska and local Serb paramilitaries, totaling at 3,000, attacked Ljubija and killed 73 Bosnian Croat civilians. Non-Serb workers at the Ljubija mine were dismissed explicitly because of their ethnicity.
