= Ljubija mine =

Iron ore mine in Bosnia and Herzegovina

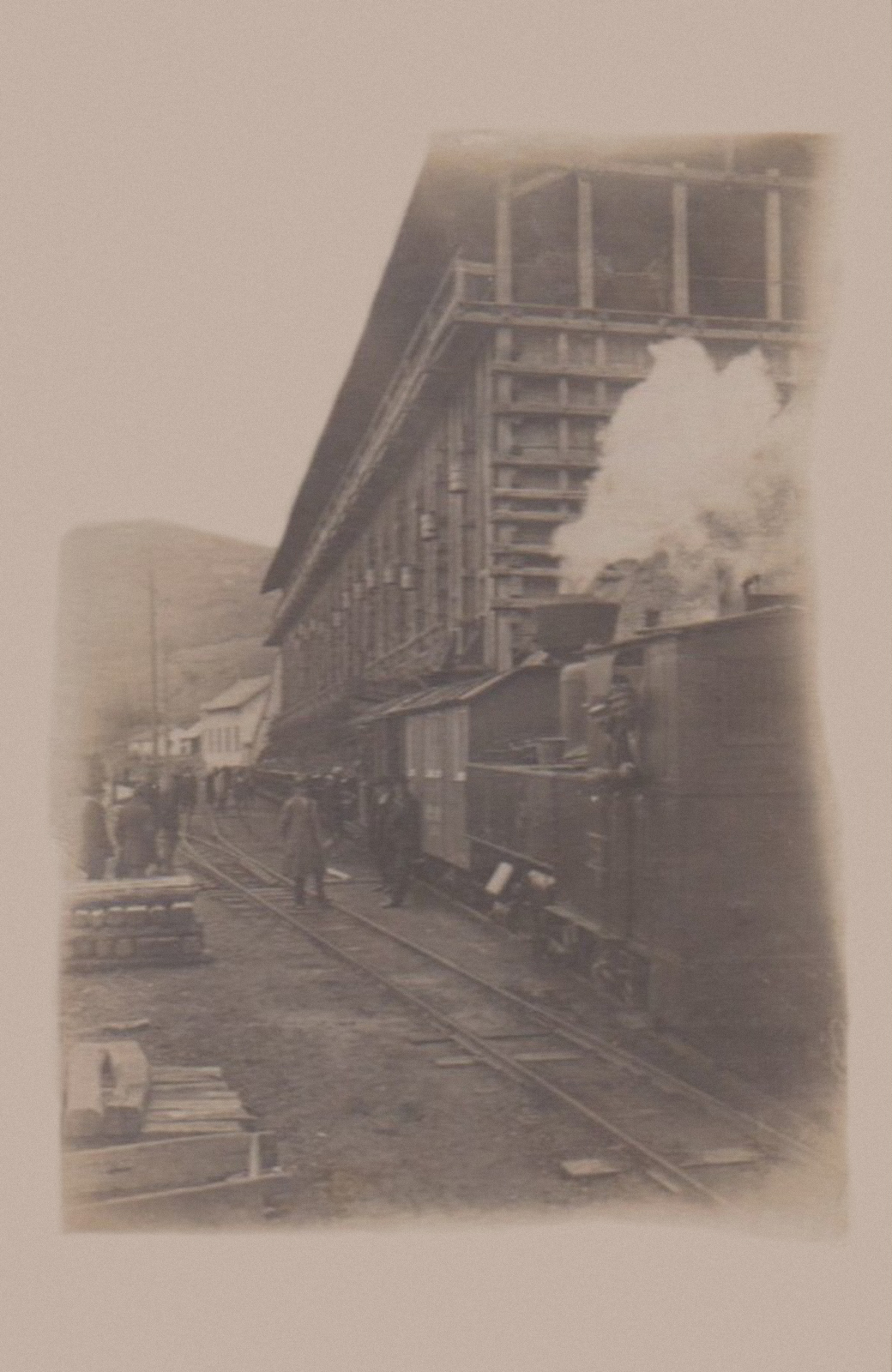
- Ljubija mine in 1938

- Location within Republika Srpska Location within Bosnia and Herzegovina
- Location: Near Ljubija, Prijedor, Republika Srpska, Bosnia and Herzegovina; 44°54′06″N 16°35′52″E
- Products: Iron ore
- Opened: 1916
- Company: Nova Ljubija d.o.o. Prijedor

The Ljubija mine is an open-pit iron ore mine near Ljubija, approximately 20 km southwest of Prijedor, in Republika Srpska, Bosnia and Herzegovina. It forms part of the wider Ljubija iron ore field, one of the country's historically significant iron-mining areas.

Industrial iron ore production began in 1916 and continued until 1992, when regular mining operations at the central Ljubija deposits were suspended. Limited trial mining took place in 2022, but the mine was classified as being in a stand-by phase in ArcelorMittal's 2025 annual report.

== Geology and mineral resources ==
The Ljubija deposits occur within Carboniferous and Permian–Triassic geological formations, partly covered by younger Quaternary sediments. The principal iron-bearing minerals are siderite and ankerite, with secondary limonite mineralization.

According to the mining company Rudnici željezne rude Ljubija, the central Ljubija mining area contains approximately 150 million tonnes of explored and verified iron ore. The deposits include limonite, limonite–baryte, carbonate and oxide ores, and siderite ores.

The wider Ljubija ore field also contains other minerals, including galena, sphalerite, baryte and fluorite. The field encompasses several mining localities, including Adamuša, Tomašica, Omarska and Vidrenjak.

== History ==
=== Early mining and industrial development ===
Iron ore extraction in the Ljubija area dates back to the Iron Age, with evidence of mining activity extending over more than 2,500 years.

Modern industrial mining began in 1916. During the 20th century, the development of the mine was accompanied by the construction of transport infrastructure, open-pit workings, ore preparation facilities and processing plants. The Ljubija mining complex became an important supplier of iron ore to steelworks throughout Yugoslavia.

Between 1916 and 1992, approximately 44.6 million tonnes of iron ore and concentrate were produced at the central Ljubija mining sites. Most of the output was supplied to Yugoslav steelworks, while a smaller proportion was exported.

=== Suspension and later developments ===
Regular iron ore production at the central Ljubija deposits was suspended in 1992. The mining and processing infrastructure subsequently remained largely inactive.

In 2004, a joint mining company was established, with ArcelorMittal's predecessor holding a controlling 51% interest and the local company Rudnici željezne rude Ljubija holding the remaining 49%. In 2022, ArcelorMittal Prijedor acquired additional mining and land rights at Ljubija and conducted trial iron ore extraction. The mine was subsequently listed as being in a stand-by phase.

=== Ownership changes and bankruptcy ===
In October 2025, ArcelorMittal completed the sale of its majority interest in the Prijedor mining company to H&P d.o.o. Zvornik, part of the Pavgord Group. Following the acquisition, the company was renamed Nova Ljubija d.o.o. Prijedor. Rudnici željezne rude Ljubija retained its 49% ownership interest.

On 12 June 2026, the District Commercial Court in Prijedor opened bankruptcy proceedings against Nova Ljubija d.o.o. Prijedor. The proceedings remained ongoing in October 2026.
