= Prijedor =

City in Republika Srpska, Bosnia and Herzegovina

Prijedor Приједор (Serbian)
- City
- Grad Prijedor; Град Приједор; City of Prijedor
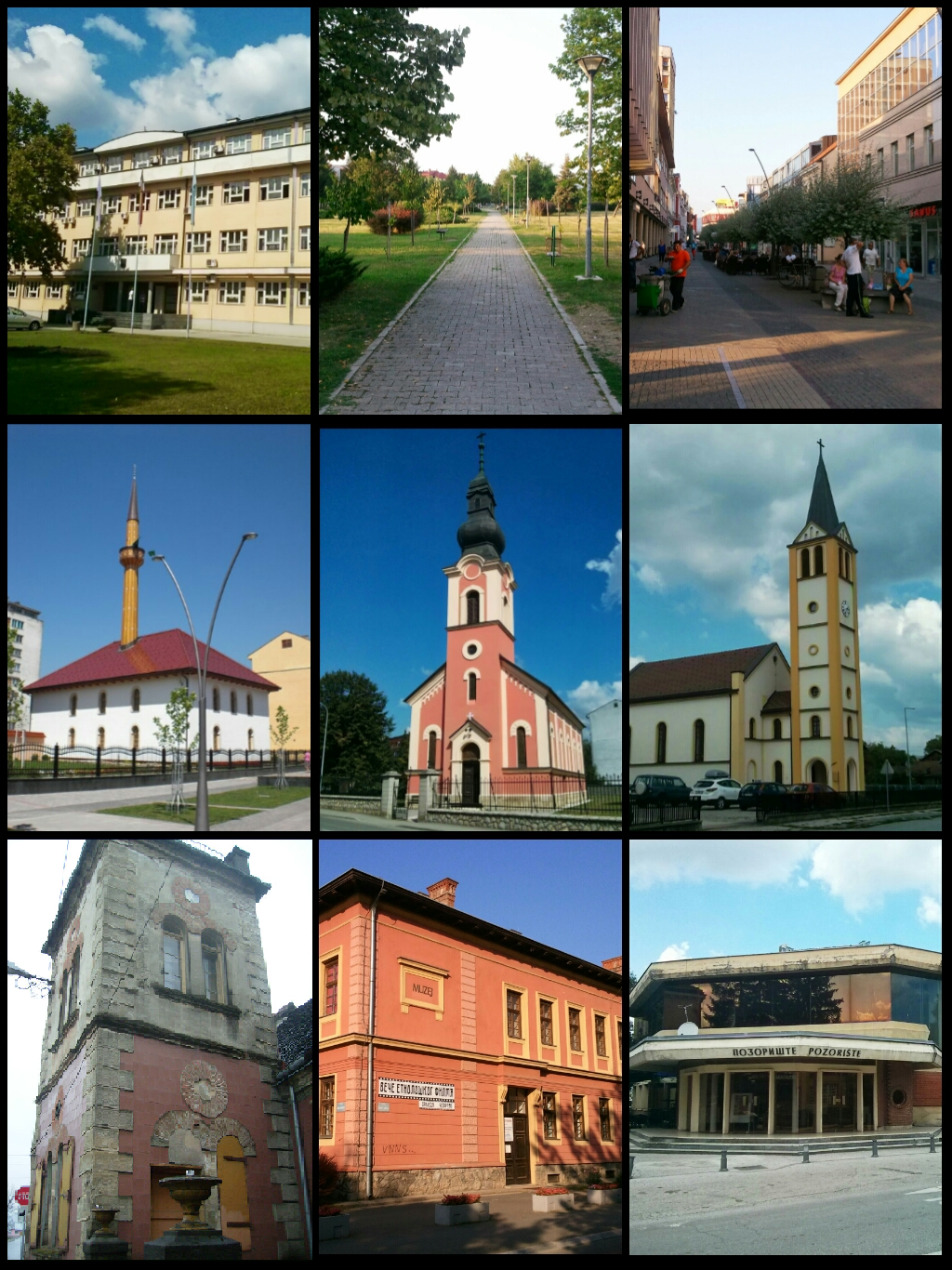
- Prijedor

- Flag Coat of arms

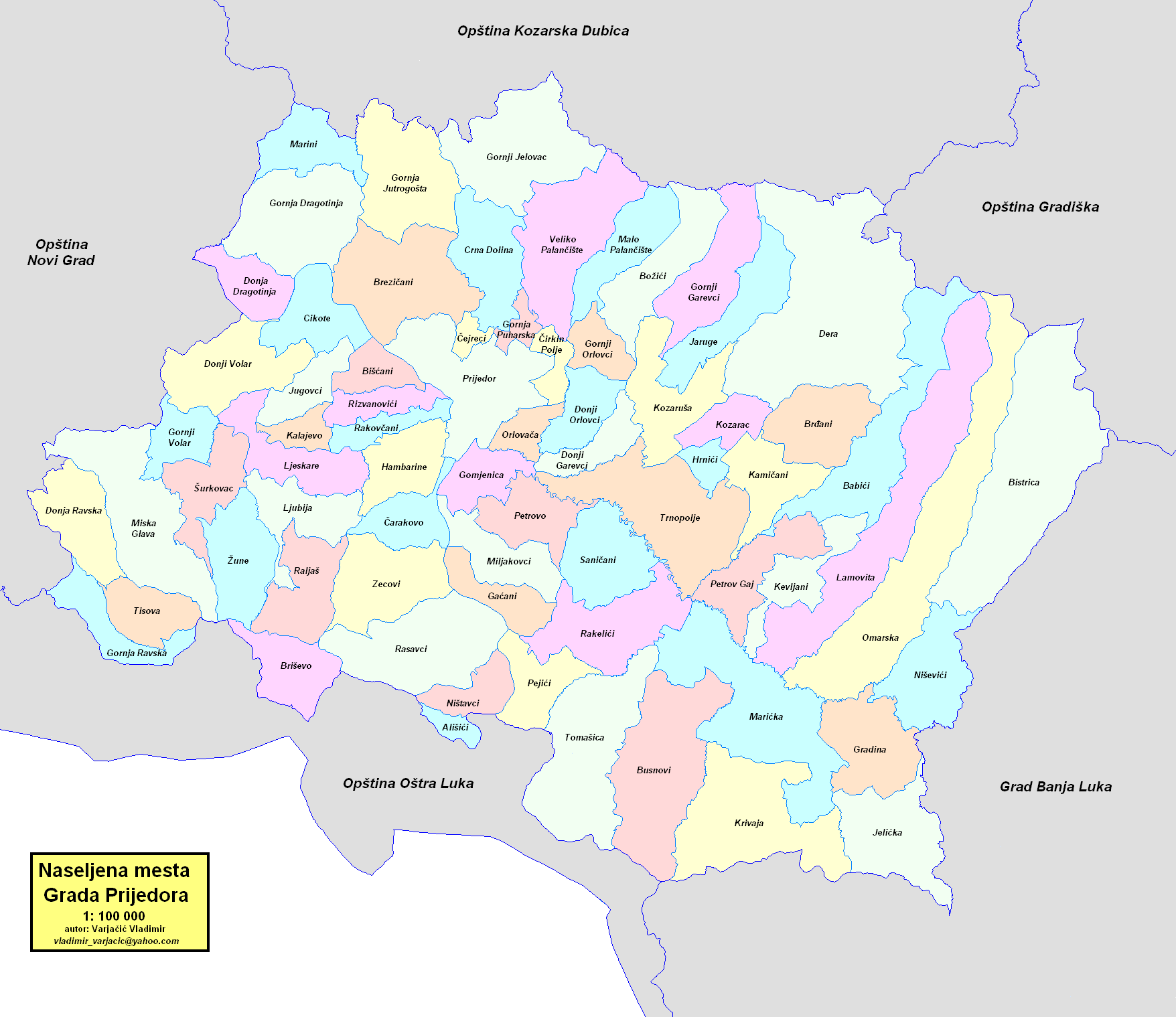
- Coordinates: 44°58′51″N 16°42′48″E
- Country: Bosnia and Herzegovina
- Entity: Republika Srpska
- Geographical region: Bosanska Krajina
- City status: July 2012

Government
  - Mayor: Slobodan Javor (SNSD)

Area
  - City: 834.06 km^{2} (322.03 sq mi)
- Elevation: 136 m (446 ft)

Population (2013 census)
  - City: 80,916
  - Density: 97.015/km^{2} (251.27/sq mi)
  - Urban: 32,342
- Time zone: UTC+1 (CET)
  - Summer (DST): UTC+2 (CEST)
- Area code: +387 052
- Website: www.prijedorgrad.org

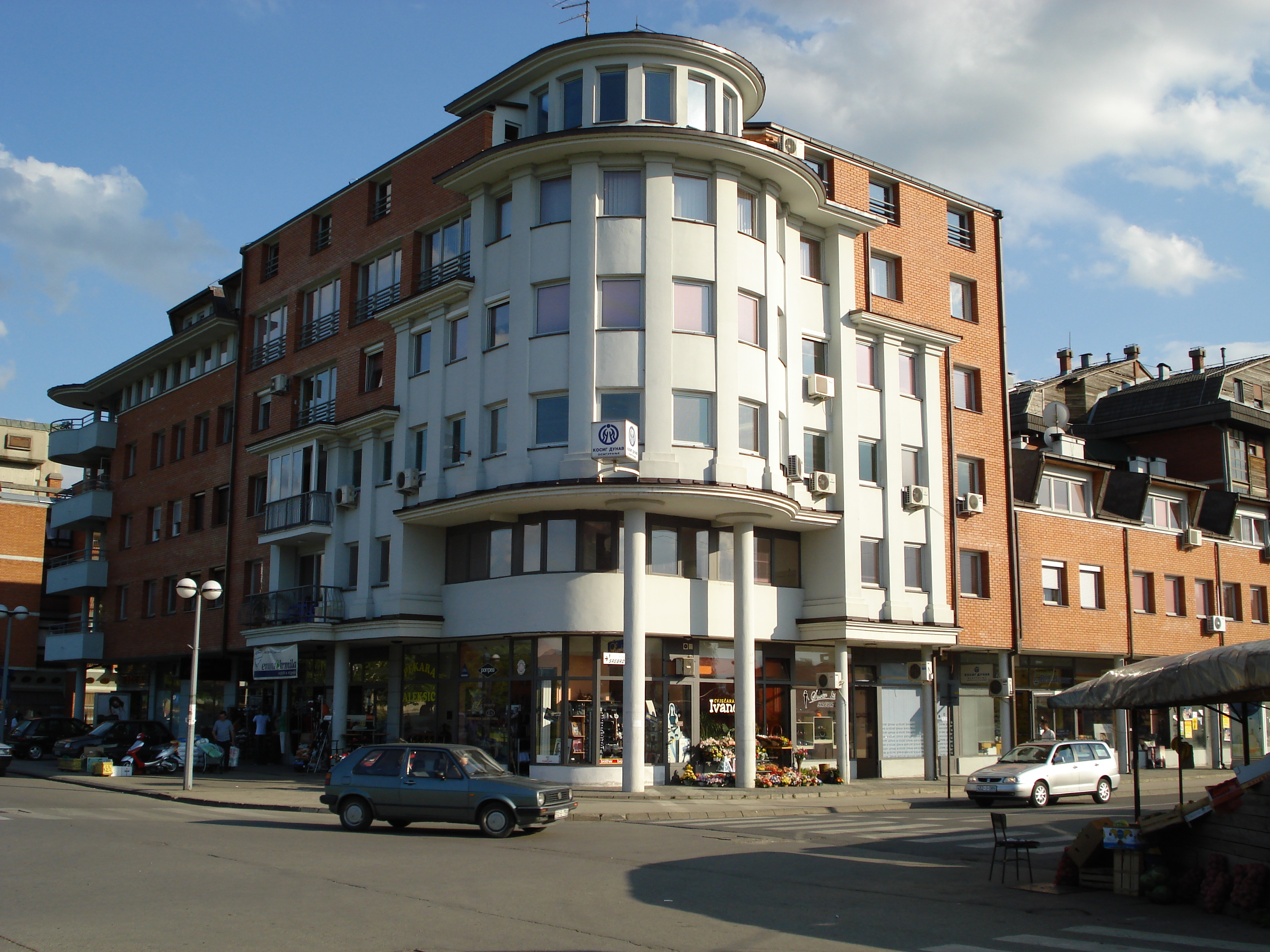
Building in the city centre

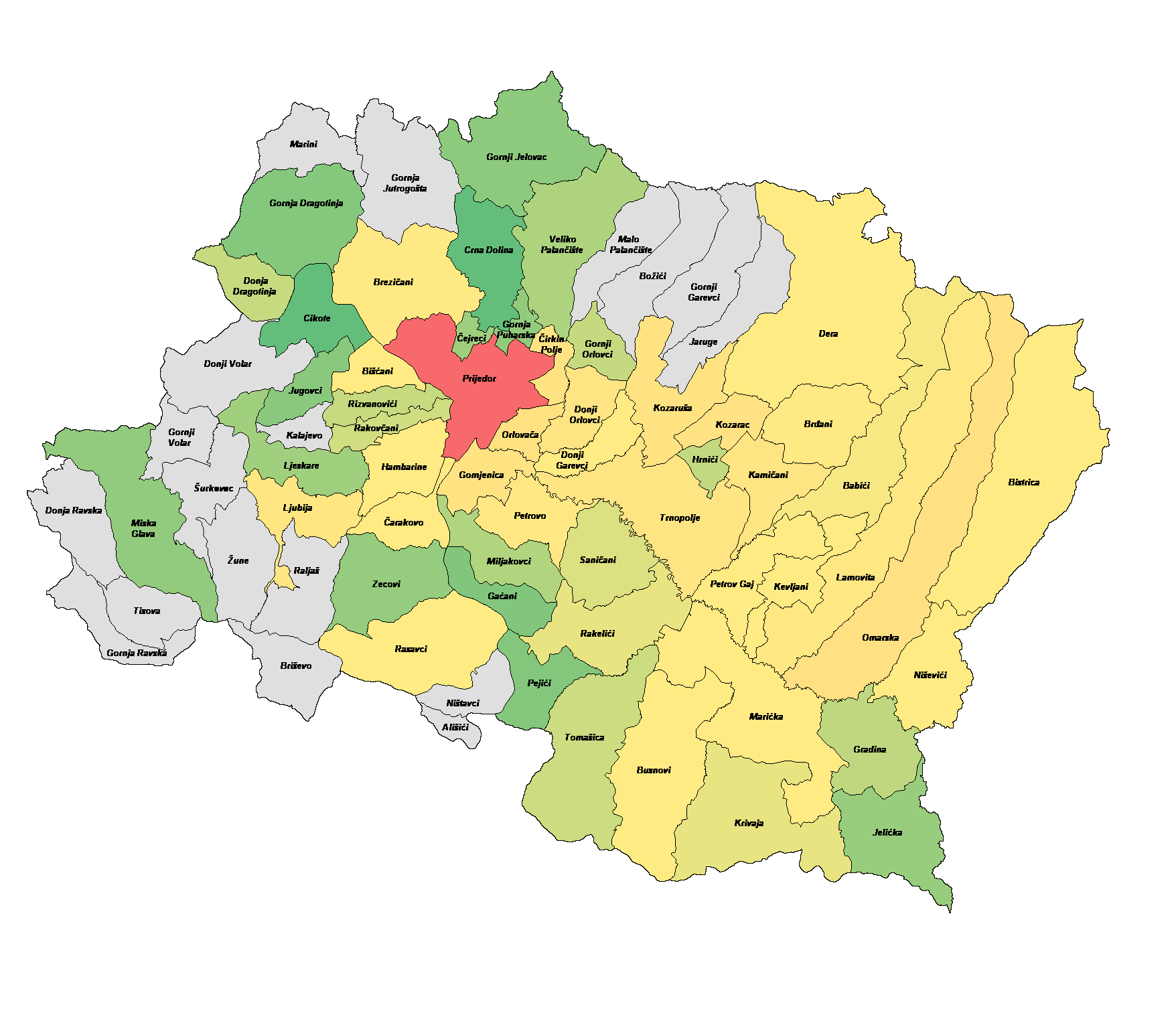
Prijedor municipality by population proportional to the settlement with the highest and lowest population

Prijedor (Serbian Cyrillic: Приједор, pronounced [prijěːdor]) is a city in Republika Srpska, Bosnia and Herzegovina. As of 2013, it had a population of 80,916 inhabitants within its administrative limits. Prijedor is situated in the geographical region of Bosanska Krajina, a northwestern part of the country.

Prijedor is known for its mixed religious heritage comprising Eastern Orthodox Christianity, Roman Catholicism and Islam. Historic buildings from the Ottoman and Austrian-Hungarian periods are a feature of the urban landscape.

== Geography ==
The urban centre of Prijedor, within the city of Prijedor, is located in the northwestern part of Bosnia and Herzegovina, on the banks of the Sana and Gomjenica rivers, and at the southwestern hills of the Kozara mountain. The area of the municipality is 833 square kilometres (322 square miles). The town is situated at 44°58'39" N and 16°42'29" E, at an altitude of 133 metres (436 feet) above sea level.

It is a part of the geographical region of Bosanska Krajina in Bosnia and Herzegovina.

The terrain ascends to the northeast of Prijedor in waves and gradually becomes the mountain range of the Kozara mountain, which is famous for uprisings in the previous centuries and battles against fascism during the Second World War.

The city lies on the alluvial terrain created by the Sana river and its tributaries on the southwestern hillsides of the Kozara mountain.

=== Climate ===
Climate data for Prijedor (1991–2020)
Month	Jan	Feb	Mar	Apr	May	Jun	Jul	Aug	Sep	Oct	Nov	Dec	Year
Record high °C (°F)	21.0 (69.8)	24.4 (75.9)	28.0 (82.4)	31.7 (89.1)	35.0 (95.0)	36.8 (98.2)	39.4 (102.9)	41.8 (107.2)	37.5 (99.5)	30.0 (86.0)	25.8 (78.4)	22.1 (71.8)	41.8 (107.2)
Mean daily maximum °C (°F)	4.9 (40.8)	8.2 (46.8)	13.7 (56.7)	18.8 (65.8)	23.2 (73.8)	27.1 (80.8)	29.1 (84.4)	29.3 (84.7)	23.4 (74.1)	17.9 (64.2)	11.4 (52.5)	5.4 (41.7)	17.7 (63.9)
Daily mean °C (°F)	0.7 (33.3)	2.6 (36.7)	7.3 (45.1)	12.1 (53.8)	16.6 (61.9)	20.7 (69.3)	22.4 (72.3)	21.9 (71.4)	16.5 (61.7)	11.7 (53.1)	6.7 (44.1)	1.7 (35.1)	11.8 (53.2)
Mean daily minimum °C (°F)	−2.9 (26.8)	−2.1 (28.2)	1.5 (34.7)	5.8 (42.4)	10.2 (50.4)	14.1 (57.4)	15.6 (60.1)	15.3 (59.5)	11.2 (52.2)	7.0 (44.6)	2.8 (37.0)	−1.6 (29.1)	6.4 (43.5)
Record low °C (°F)	−24.0 (−11.2)	−23.0 (−9.4)	−19.0 (−2.2)	−5.3 (22.5)	−0.3 (31.5)	2.7 (36.9)	7.0 (44.6)	5.2 (41.4)	0.4 (32.7)	−6.2 (20.8)	−10.0 (14.0)	−22.0 (−7.6)	−24.0 (−11.2)
Average precipitation mm (inches)	63.7 (2.51)	60.3 (2.37)	64.9 (2.56)	80.3 (3.16)	90.7 (3.57)	87.6 (3.45)	73.7 (2.90)	68.1 (2.68)	113.9 (4.48)	91.4 (3.60)	86.8 (3.42)	77.6 (3.06)	959.0 (37.76)
Average precipitation days (≥ 1.0 mm)	8.1	8.1	8.0	9.5	9.6	8.6	7.3	6.4	8.8	8.6	9.0	9.9	101.9
Source: NOAA

== History ==
=== Ancient period ===
Prijedor's history as a fortified population centre can be traced back to the end of the 17th century. The history of the colonization and surrounding culture is much older. Numerous prehistoric, ancient and medieval archaeological sites are evidence of the presence of a variety of different cultures. There are multiple settlements from the prehistoric period, dating back to 2100 B.C., usually associated with burial sites. In the pre-Roman and Roman times the area was settled by a large Illyrian tribe, the Maezaei. In nearby Ljubija, many Roman monuments have been found that provide evidence of iron production.

=== Ottoman and Austrian Period ===
Prijedor is mentioned for the first time as Palanka Praedor, a small wooden fort in the list of those places in the Ottoman Empire that were devastated by Croatian troops between 1693 and 1696. It appeared in letters written in Latin by commander of the Croatian generalate units, Earl Batthyány. In this part of Bosnia a large number of fortifications were constructed to protect often contested borders with Austria. Later on, many fortifications were destroyed during the Austro-Ottoman War as the borders moved towards the east and south in favor of Austria. It took nearly 50 years for Prijedor to appear again in the list of settlements.

At the same place in the middle of the 18th century, a new fortress appeared, coinciding with Christian settlement in the vicinity. These regions were under Ottoman dominion until 1878.

The town began to develop rapidly due to the navigability of the Sana River, the growth of trade and crafts, and later, the construction of the first railway through Prijedor. The first railroad in Bosnia and Herzegovina was built in 1873 next to Prijedor and went from Dobrljin to Banja Luka. The fortress existed as a military base until 1851 when the army left and the walls were demolished by the local population who used the walls to build their own houses. A huge fire in 1882 destroyed most of the town. The next year the Austrian authorities opened a large sawmill at the bottom of the mountain Kozara, which is the first industrial object in the history of Prijedor.

The years after the fire there was intensive development of the town, encompassing both private and state-owned structures. New buildings were built, such as the Serbian elementary school, a Catholic Church, an Eastern Orthodox Church, and a hotel. The first cultural associations appeared in the town as well as libraries, reading rooms and a printing house. The end of the First World War created a fledgling state—the Kingdom of Serbs, Croats, and Slovenes—with Bosnia and Herzegovina as a part of it. Prijedor was an important place as the trade and crafts centre of the whole region. The opening of an iron ore mine in nearby Ljubija in 1916 strengthened the economy of the town. During that period, the mine was one of the biggest and most modern iron ore mines in Europe.

From 1929 to 1941, Prijedor was part of the Vrbas Banovina of the Kingdom of Yugoslavia.

=== World War II ===
During World War II, the Prijedor and Kozara area was affected by the Kozara Offensive of June and July 1942. The Mrakovica memorial complex on Kozara, designed by Dušan Džamonja, commemorates the region's Yugoslav Partisans and civilians killed by Axis forces.

Some Serb villages around Prijedor and Kozara Mountain suffered the deaths of tremendous numbers of civilians, who were killed by the Ustaše and taken to different concentration camps during the genocide campaign; one of these was Jastrebarsko Concentration Camp, where Serb, Jewish and Roma children were imprisoned and killed.

=== Bosnian war ===
During the Bosnian War (1992–1995), Prijedor was the site of an ethnic cleansing campaign committed by the Bosnian Serb political and military leadership – Army of the Republika Srpska, mostly against Bosniak and Croat civilians. The area near Prijedor housed the Omarska, Keraterm, and Trnopolje camps established in 1992 as part of ethnic-cleansing of the Bosniak and Croat population during the civil war. The population of non-Serbs was drastically reduced: out of a population of 50,000 Bosniaks and 6,000 Croats, only some 6,000 Bosniaks and 3,000 Croats remained in the municipality by the end of the war. Apart from the Srebrenica massacre, Prijedor is the area with the second highest rate of civilian killings committed during the Bosnian War. According to the Sarajevo-based Research and Documentation Center (IDC), 4,868 people were killed or went missing in the Prijedor municipality during the war. Among them were 3,515 Bosniak civilians, 186 Croat civilians and 78 Serb civilians. As of October 2013, 96 mass graves have been located and around 2,100 victims have been identified, largely by DNA analysis.

== Demographics ==
=== Ethnic composition ===
Ethnic composition of the Township of Prijedor
Ethnicity	2013.	1991.	1981.	1971.	1961.
Serbs	54,356 (67.18%)	47,581 (42.28%)	45,279 (41.59%)	46,487 (47.49%)	21,532 (54.17%)
Muslims/Bosniaks	22,303 (27.56%)	49,351 (43.85%)	42,129 (38.70%)	39,190 (40.03%)	10,140 (25.51%)
Croats	1,666 (2.06%)	6,316 (5.61%)	7,297 (6.70%)	8,845 (9.04%)	2 384 (6.00%)
Others	2,591 (3.20%)	9,295 (8.26%)	14,163 (13.01%)	3,372 (3.44%)	5,695 (14.33%)
Total	80,916	112,543	108,868	97,894	39,751

== Education ==
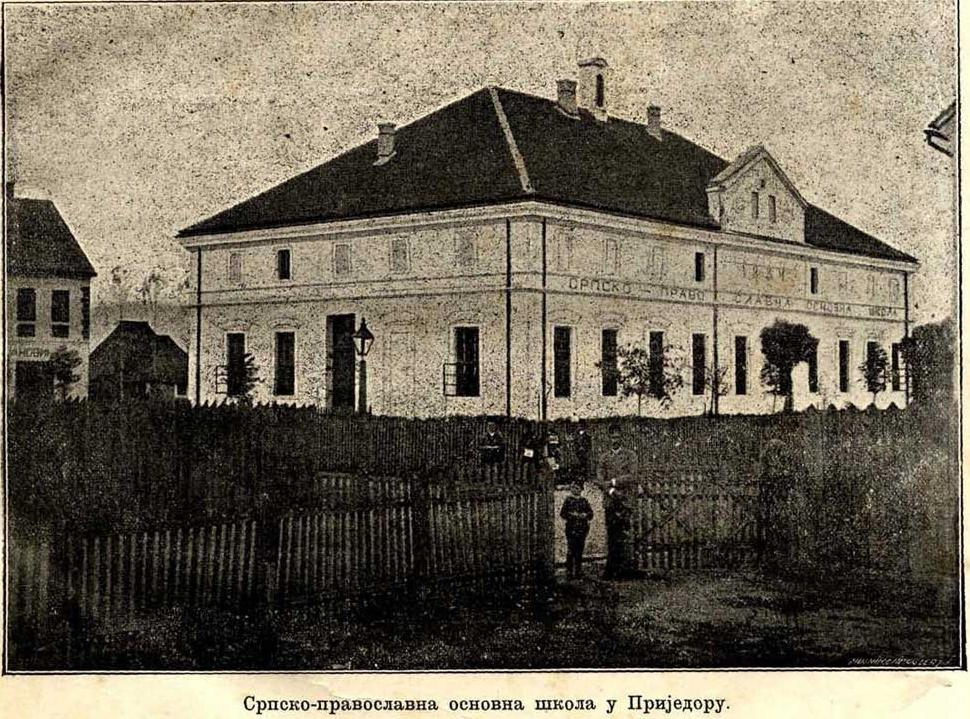
A Serb Elementary School in Prijedor in 1889

The first forms of organized education can be traced back to the first half of the 19th century. In 1834 Prijedor had the "Serb elementary school" that later with the so-called "Communal school" was transformed into the "State school" in 1919. One of the earliest and most important educational institutions was the Prijedor Gymnasium, founded in 1923.

Elementary and High schools Nowadays, there are 11 elementary schools with circa 8,000 students and 6 high schools attended by around 4,000 students. A music school and a special school for mentally challenged people are also part of the city educational system.

Colleges and Universities Over the last several years, important steps have been taken, aimed at establishing colleges. As a result, Prijedor now has a University college of Economics and IT, a University College of Medicine, and a mining geology department of the University of Banja Luka. In the northwestern part of the city in the neighborhood of Pećani a Law and Economics faculty is under construction. These are the first steps to establish an independent university centre in Prijedor. Today, Prijedor has around 1300 enrolled students.

== Economy ==
Prijedor regional location.

Prijedor is a large service and industrial centre and hosts some of the largest companies in Bosnia and Herzegovina.

It has a developed financial sector; 11 international banks are represented in the city, as well as 5 microfinance organizations and a foundation for development. The city's huge economic potential lies in its strategic geographical location, as it is close to Zagreb, Belgrade, Budapest and Vienna, giving it one of the best climates for economic expansion in Bosnia and Herzegovina.

The arable land around the city, raw minerals and growth of the educated population in the city proper gives it a combination of being able to produce industrial products, and food and service industries.

Economic preview

The following table gives a preview of total number of registered people employed in professional per their core activity (as of 2018):

Professional field	Total
Agriculture, forestry and fishing	262
Mining and quarrying	835
Manufacturing	2,825
Electricity, gas, steam and air conditioning supply	250
Water supply; sewerage, waste management and remediation activities	315
Construction	474
Wholesale and retail trade, repair of motor vehicles and motorcycles	2,542
Transportation and storage	638
Accommodation and food services	876
Information and communication	154
Financial and insurance activities	227
Real estate activities	58
Professional, scientific and technical activities	340
Administrative and support service activities	221
Public administration and defense; compulsory social security	1,003
Education	1,391
Human health and social work activities	1,196
Arts, entertainment and recreation	61
Other service activities	317
Total	13,985

=== Companies ===
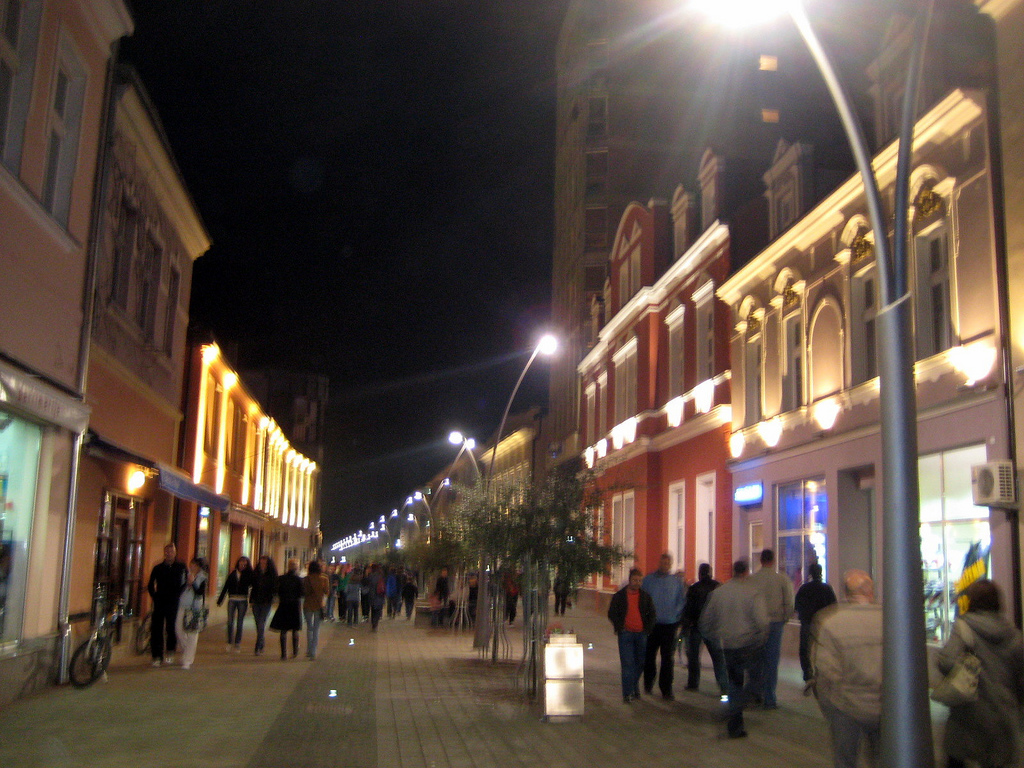
Prijedor at night

The city today hosts the Bosnian headquarters of the ArcelorMittal Steel Company, which is the world's largest steel company, with over 320,000 employees in more than 60 countries. Prijedor also contains companies specialized in the chemical industry such as Ferrox A.D., producing iron oxides and pigments. BosnaMontaza A.D., one of Bosnia and Herzegovina's most specialized steel manufacturers, manufactures steel, pipelines, reservoirs, technological equipment, cranes and energy plants.

Other companies such as the Croatian food company Kraš has one of its facilities in Bosnia and Herzegovina in Prijedor. Brand names such as "Prijedorčanka" are one of the leading producers of the alcoholic beverage Rakija in Bosnia and Herzegovina, placing its products in Bosnia and Herzegovina, Serbia and Croatia.

=== Agricultural sector ===
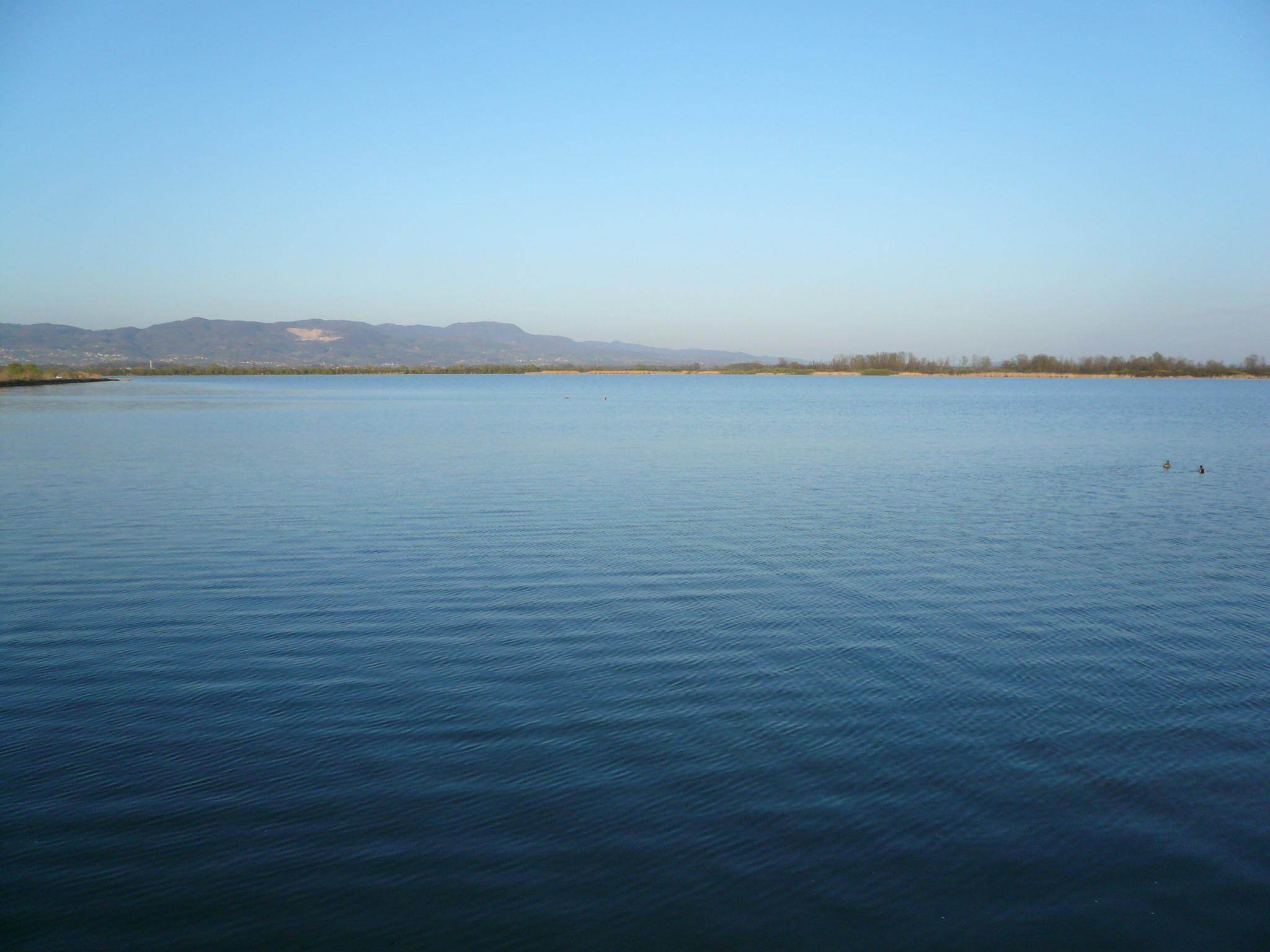
Lake Saničani fish farm

Aside from fishing, Prijedor has a fruit growing industry, gardening industry, agricultural industry, mill and bakery industries, animal husbandry, processing industry, as well as a dairy industry.

Lake Saničani, near Prijedor, is one of the biggest commercial fish farming lakes in Southern Europe. Prijedor city takes up 83,406 hectares (58,450 ha being private property and 24,956 ha state property). Plowed fields and gardens take up 34,026 hectares, orchards 2,386 hectares and vineyards 5,000 hectares. All cultivated soil takes up 40,206 hectares.

=== Service sector ===
The service sector in Prijedor is growing rapidly and this is reflected in the growth of hotels, stores, roads, educational facilities and shopping centres that are being built in the city, making it a growing commercial hub in Bosnia and Herzegovina.

== Transport and aviation ==
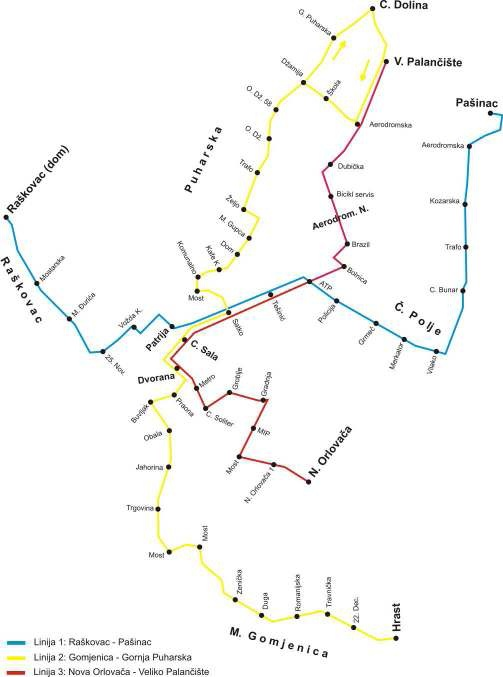
Map of Prijedor public transport

Prijedor is connected by road with Banja Luka, Kozarska Dubica, Novi Grad, Sanski Most and other settlements in northwestern Bosnia and Herzegovina. Two main roads pass through the city area: the M4 road, connecting Banja Luka, Prijedor and Novi Grad, and the M15 road, connecting Kozarska Dubica, Prijedor and Sanski Most.

Prijedor is linked by rail with Banja Luka and Novi Grad, while the wider railway route connects the city with regional passenger and freight corridors.

Prijedor also has an airfield in the northeastern part of the city, in the area of Urije. The airfield has a fleet of light aircraft and sailplanes. The airfield also serves as the home of the city's renowned Parachuting Club.

== Culture ==
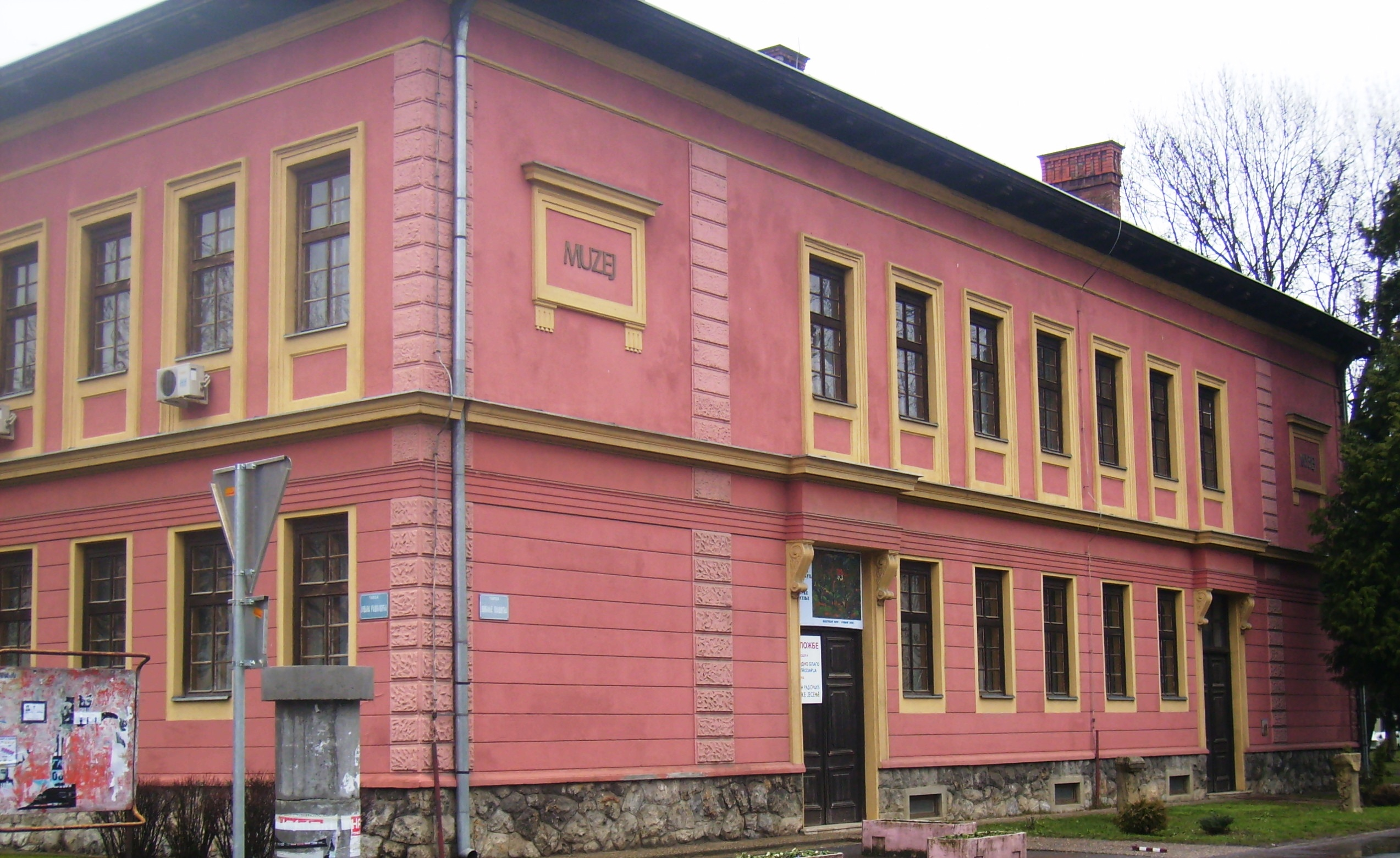
Prijedor museum.

Prijedor has a various number of galleries, religious sights, libraries, statues, fountains, national monuments, cinemas and a city theater.

=== Archeological findings ===
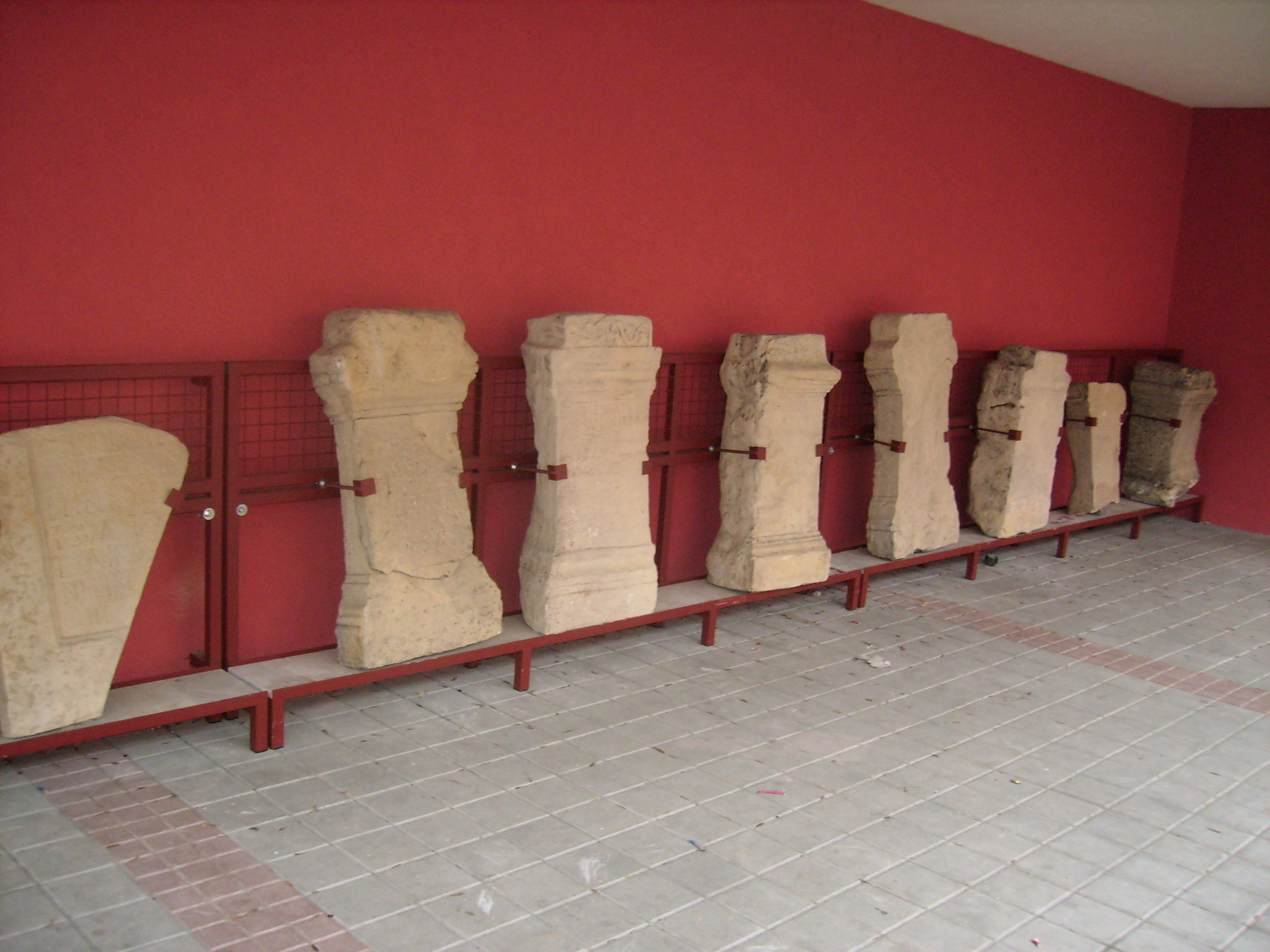
Archeological findings at the Prijedor Museum

=== Natural attractions ===
Kozara National Park is one of the main natural and recreational attractions near Prijedor. Its central area is Mrakovica, located about 24 km from Prijedor. The park was established in 1967 and covers 3,494.51 hectares.

=== Museums ===
Prijedor is home to the Museum of Kozara founded in 1953, which has a regional status.

It is also home to the local national hero, Dr. Mladen Stojanović. His house has been converted into the Stojanović Memorial House.

At the Kozara National Park, in the vicinity of Prijedor, there is the Mrakovica War Museum. It includes the Second World War photographs, guns and artillery used during the Battle of Kozara.

=== Theatre ===
Pozorište Prijedor was founded in 1953, though the tradition of theatre in Prijedor can be dated back to the 19th century. The theatre hosts different plays during the year, starring actors from within and outside of Bosnia and Herzegovina. Besides theatrical plays, the theatre hosts local city choirs that perform regularly.

=== Religious sites ===
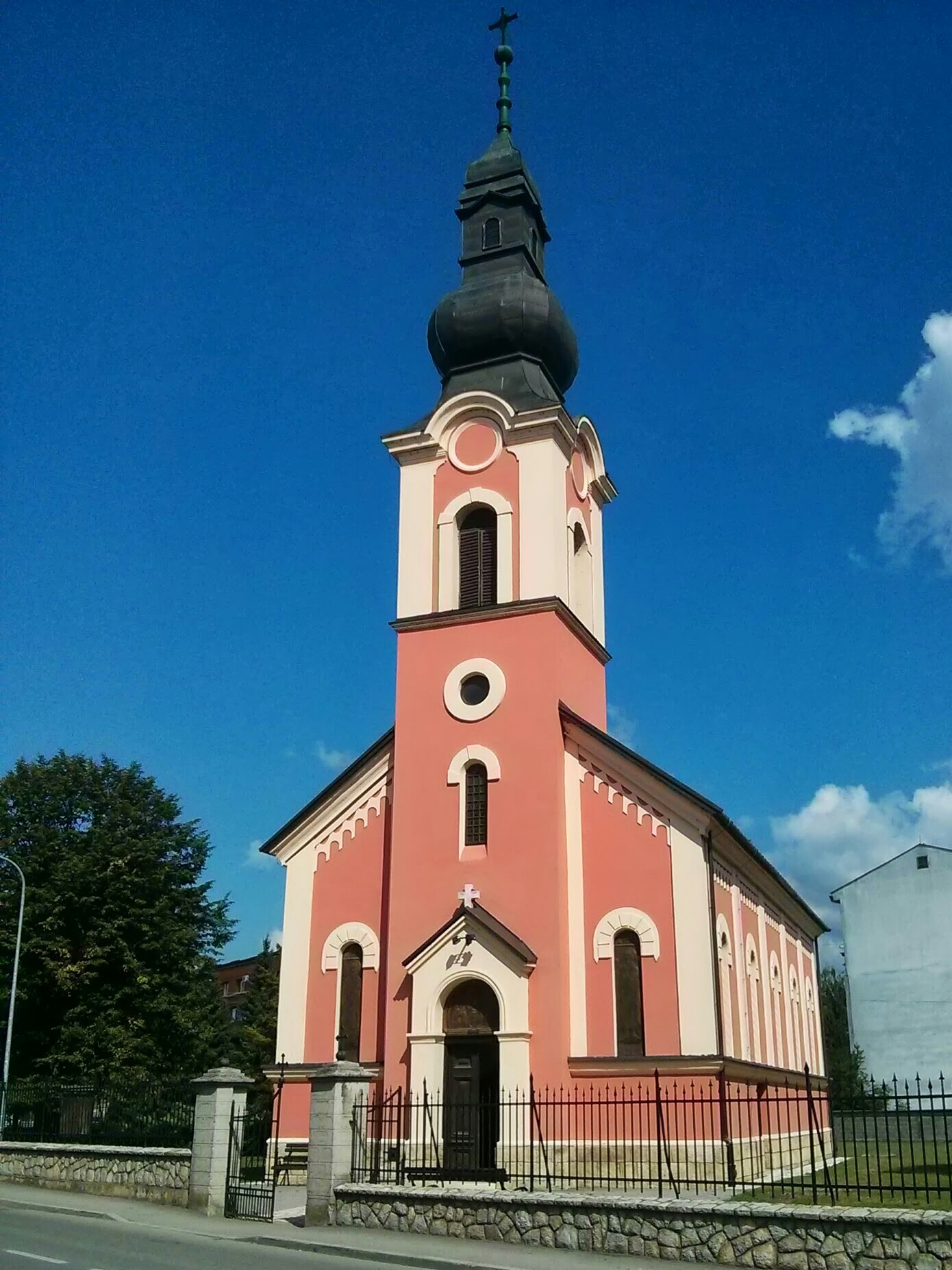
Serbian Orthodox church

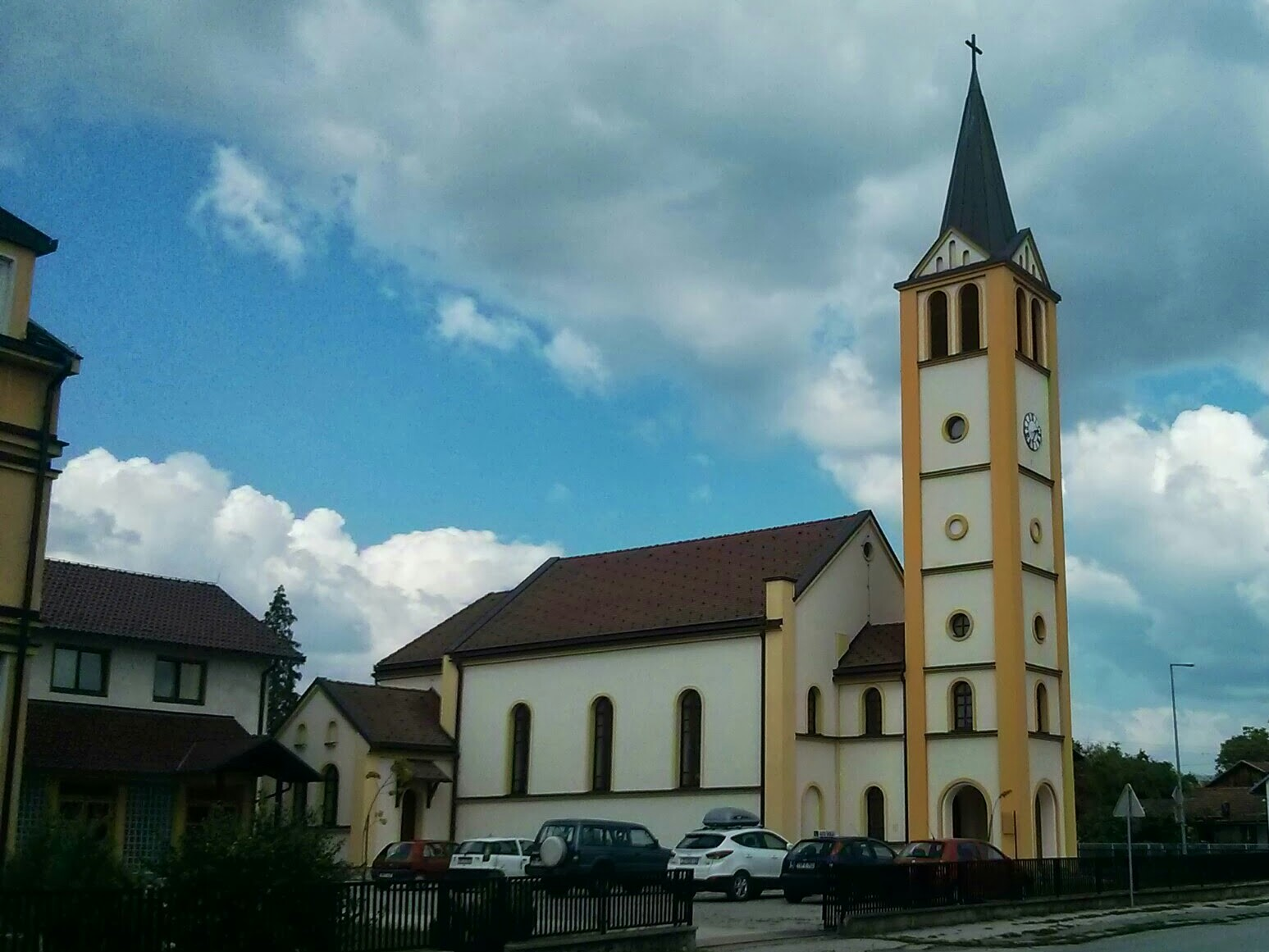
Roman Catholic church

Prijedor is known for being a multi-religious society, that includes a Catholic church, Eastern Orthodox churches and Mosques. Due to this Prijedor has a large number of mosques in the city centre, one of the oldest dating back to the 16th and 17th century.

The most known is the City mosque "Čaršijska džamija" built in 1750 located on the main street. The mosque includes a library and a school. Mostly all of the city's 33 mosques and the catholic cathedral that were damaged have now been rebuilt.

Other sights are the Eastern Orthodox church "Crkva Svete Trojice" built in 1891, which is surrounded by a wall including a small church park. The catholic cathedral "Sv. Josip" built in 1898 is located in the northern part of the city centre close to the city theatre.

Prijedor used to have a small Jewish population before WWII and the Bosnian war, but nowadays there are no traces of the former Jewish population in the city.

=== Festivals ===
The Day of Honey: Locally called "Dani meda". A trade and tourist event where local honey producers from the Prijedor area and beyond gather at the square in the main street to sell and demonstrate their products.

The Prijedor "Summer on the Sana" Festival: "Ljeto na sani". Cultural, artistic and other events along the city river shore.

Writers' Gathering: Each year in September, a cultural gathering "Writers' gathering in Kozara", where works of literature by local authors are presented, takes place.

The Days of Winter: This tourist event is held at the beginning of February in the mountain Kozara. It lasts three days and its main aim is to promote tourist potentials of the Kozara mountain. Sporting and gastronomic competitions followed by a rich entertaining programme are an integral part of this event.

International Chorus Festival – Zlatna Vila: This cultural event is held in The National Theatre of Prijedor every May and it represents a competition in choral singing. Participants of the festival are choirs from different countries both from ex-Yugoslavia and beyond.

St Peter's Day Parachuting Cup: Each year, in the month of July, a sporting event, the St Peter's Day Parachuting Cup, is held. Parachutists from different countries take part in this event, and competitions are organised in various categories: women, men, juniors and teams.

SHA Fest (ŠA Fest): A non profit annual festival of music and arts established to honour the multitalented late artist Dalibor Popović Miksa, which lasts four days. All profit goes to the D.P. Miksa Foundation for the promotion of arts, scholarships and funding of talented artists.

=== Sports ===
The local football club, FK Rudar Prijedor, plays in the second tier of Bosnia and Hercegovina, The First League of the Republika Srpska.

Among the oldest sporting clubs in Prijedor is the football club OFK Prijedor founded in 1919. The tennis club of Prijedor was founded by Mladen Stojanović in 1932, though tennis was first played in the city in 1914.

Every summer since 1967 the Club organizes tennis tournaments in memory of Dr. Mladen Stojanovic (previously Memorijal, now called Prijedor Open). The Kozara skiing centre is located in Mrakovica. All ski lifts are functional and there is a ski path for children in Mrakovica as well. The skiing centre is inside the Kozara national park and there are several possibilities for mountain house rentals. A renovated hotel with various sports facilities lies close to the ski path.

Other popular sports in Prijedor are basketball and handball. The highest ranked teams are ŽKK Mladost Prijedor, KK Prijedor (Basketball), and RK Prijedor (Handball).

== Gallery ==
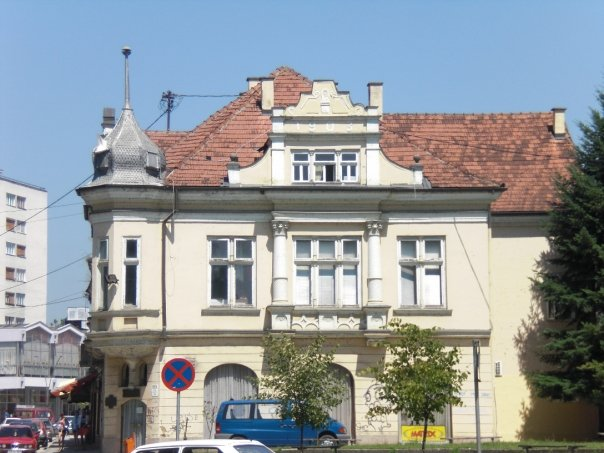
Austro-Hungarian architecture

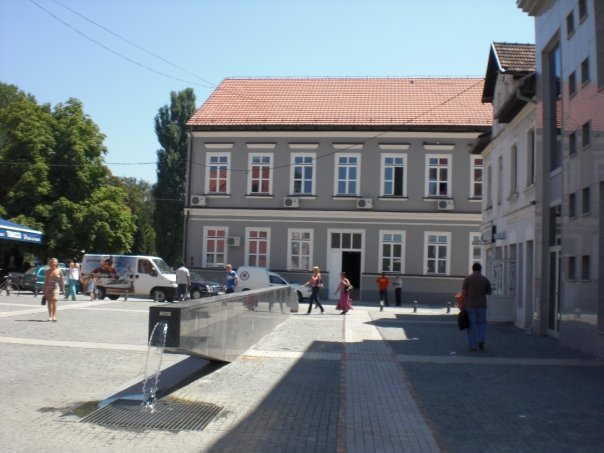
Fountain in the city centre

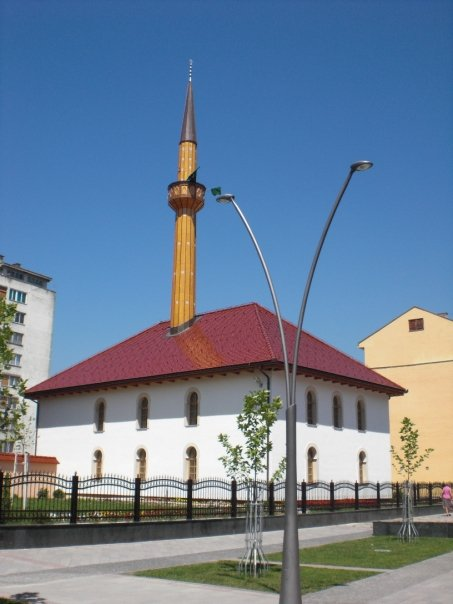
Old city mosque

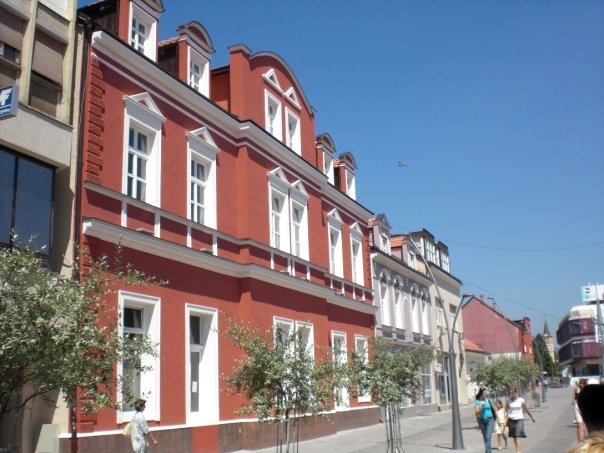
Prijedor main street buildings

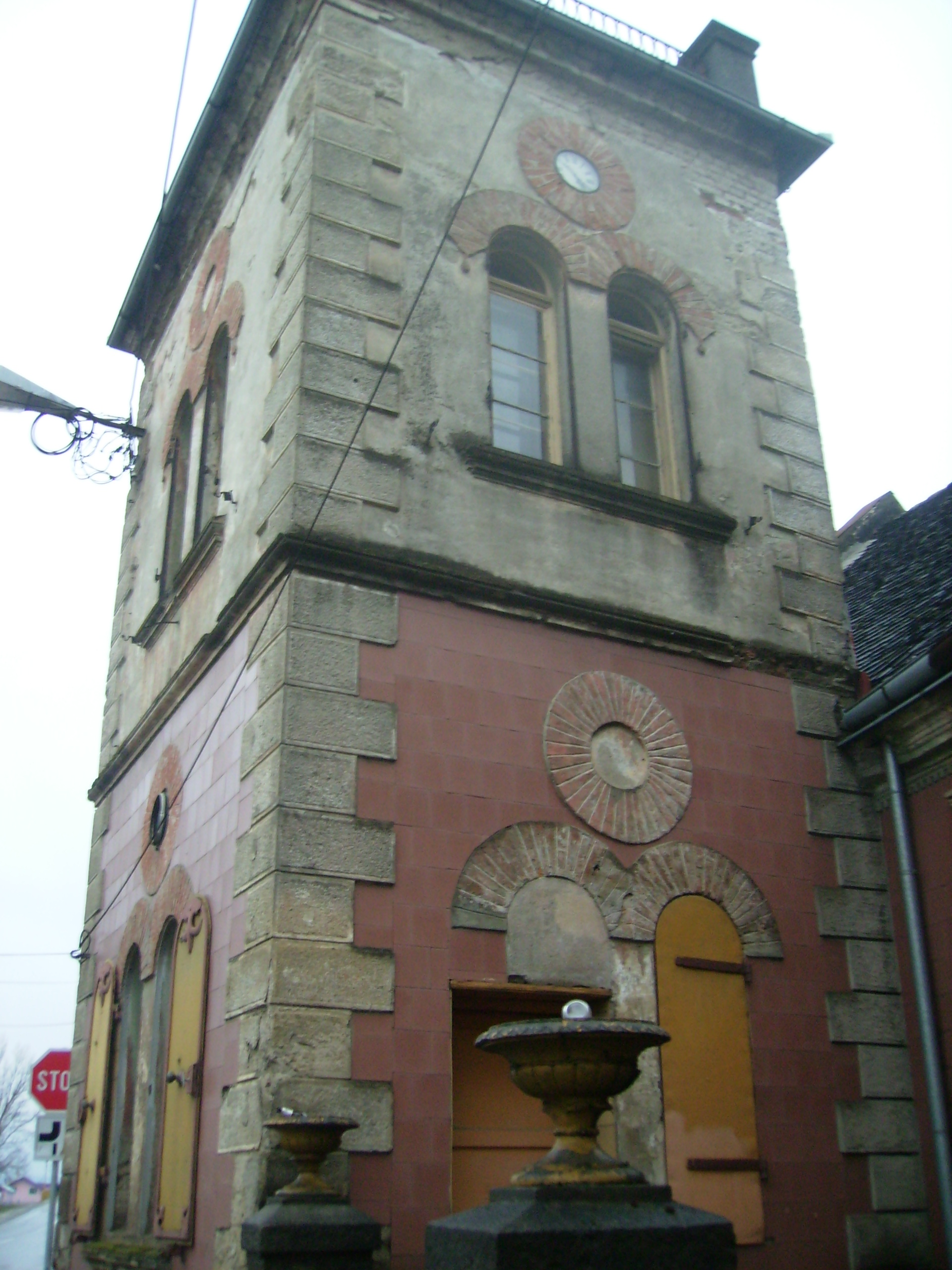
Old tower/Stara kula

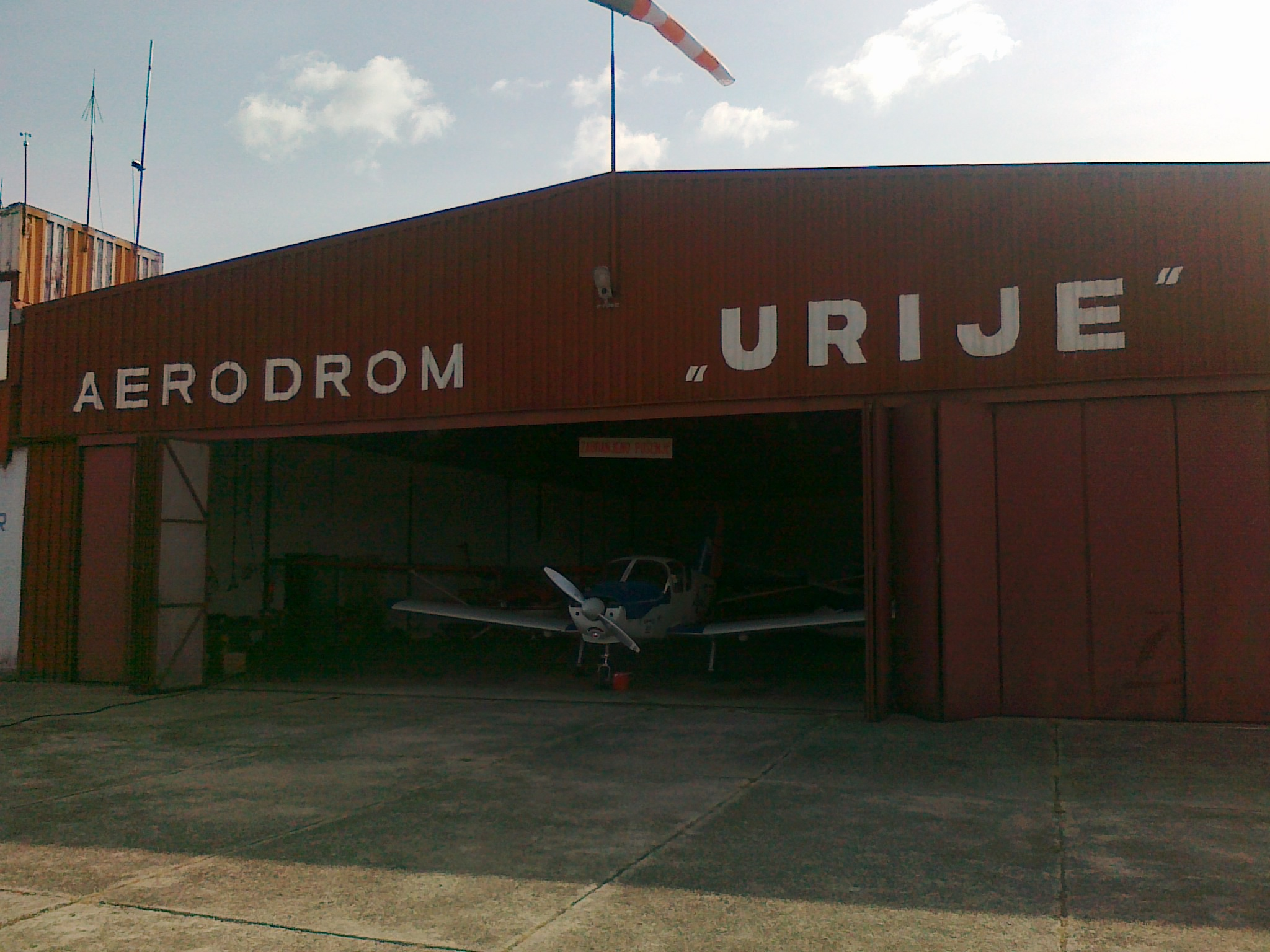
Urije Airport

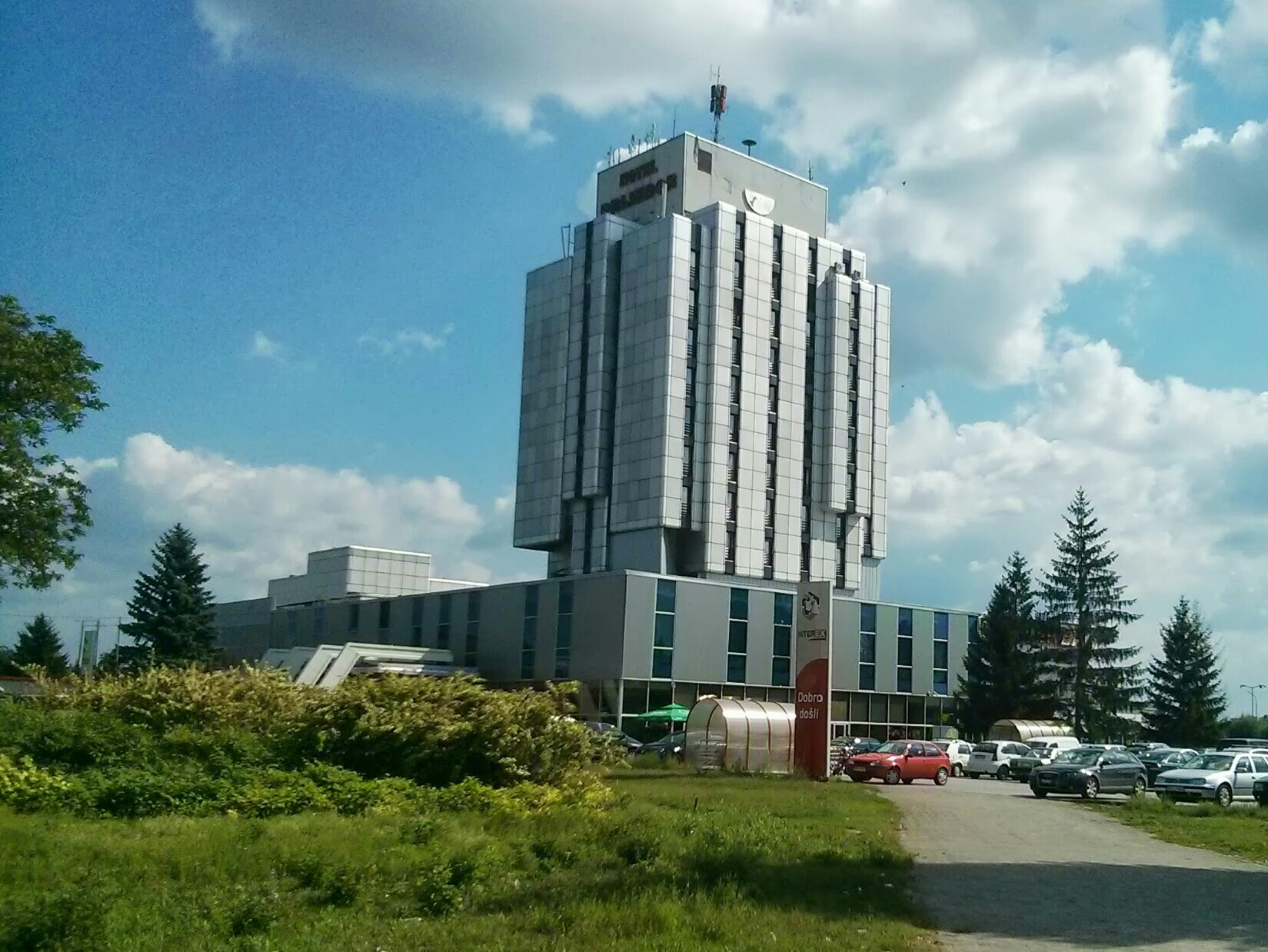
Hotel Prijedor

== Notable people ==
- Mladen Stojanović, leader of Yugoslav Partisans in western Bosnia and a People's Hero of Yugoslavia
- Nermin Alukić Čerkez, musician, vocalist and guitarist in the well-known Bosnian Sevdalinka band, "Mostar Sevdah Reunion"
- Zlatan Arnautović, former handball player, Olympic champion
- Nasko Budimlić, musician, drummer in the Bosnian hard rock band Divlje Jagode
- Edis Elkasević, Croatian shot putter
- Nebojša Grahovac, professional handballer
- Vehid Gunić, journalist and writer
- Fikret Hodžić, professional bodybuilder
- Idriz Hošić, football player, European Championship silver medalist
- Josip Iličić, Slovenian football player
- Eldin Jakupović, Swiss football player
- Milja Marin, the subject of the iconic photograph Kozarčanka
- Dragomir Mršić, Swedish actor
- Nebojša Popović, handball player, Olympic champion
- Živko Radišić, politician and former chairman of the Presidency of Bosnia and Herzegovina
- Sreten Stojanović, sculptor
- Borislav Topić, football player
- Todor Švrakić, painter
- Siniša Saničanin professional footballer who plays as for Partizan and the Bosnia and Herzegovina national team
- Halid Muslimović, singer, one of the best-selling folk acts in the former Yugoslavia

== International relations ==
=== Twin towns – sister cities ===
Prijedor is twinned with:

- Bovec, Slovenia
- Centro Storico – Piedicastello (Trento), Italy
- Demir Hisar, North Macedonia
- Kikinda, Serbia
- Irkutsk, Russia
- Manisa, Turkey
- Ningbo, China
- Øygarden, Norway
- Pančevo, Serbia
- Velenje, Slovenia

=== Partnerships ===
- Novo Mesto, Slovenia

== See also ==
- Ljubija mine
