= Bjelovacka =

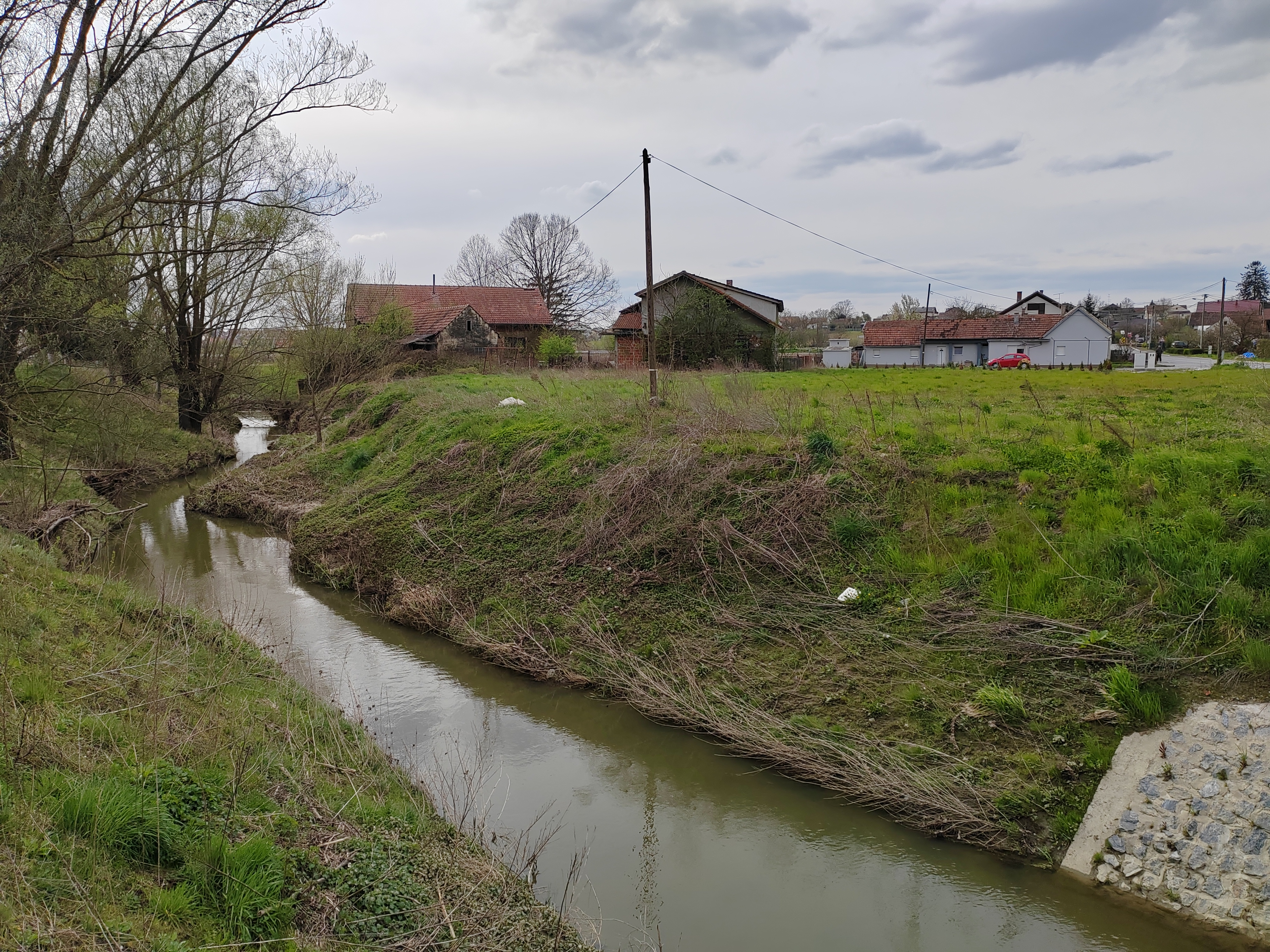
- Bjelovacka by Trojstveni Markovac within Bjelovar

Location
- Country: Croatia

Physical characteristics
- Source
  - location: Veliko Trojstvo
  - elevation: 145 m (476 ft)
- Mouth
  - location: Česma
  - coordinates: 45°50′27″N 16°48′7″E
  - elevation: 106 m (348 ft)
- Length: 20 km (12 miles)

Basin features
- Progression: Česma→ Lonja→ Sava→ Danube→ Black Sea

Bjelovacka, also sometimes called Bjelovarska, is a small river and tributary of the Česma river. It flows in the vicinity of the city of Bjelovar.

Bjelovacka forms at the mouth of two small streams named Jelinec and Seča north of Veliko Trojstvo, both of which originate from the slopes of Bilogora. South of Bjelovar, within Veliko Korenovo and Narta it flows into the Česma.

== Etymology ==
Older names include Bjelovačka, Beloblcka or Beloblaška, and in Hungarian sources Bellovacka. And in some even older sources the river was known by the name Česmica or Chesmicha.

== Description ==
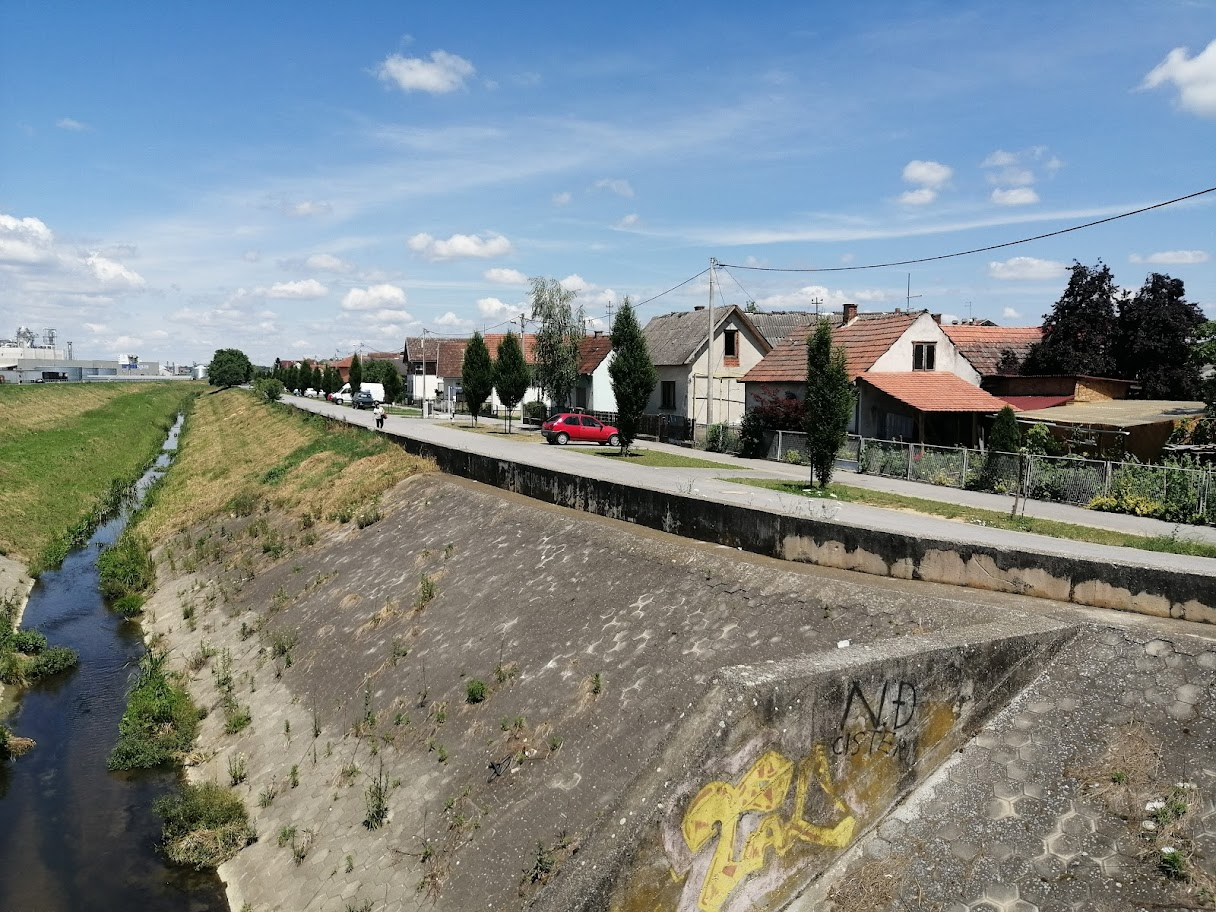
Bjelovacka near Radničko naselje in Bjelovar

Bjelovacka flows through Veliko Trojstvo, Grginac, Prokljuvani, Trojstveni Markovac, Novoseljani, Brezovac and Veliko Korenovo until it flows into the Česma river near Narta. Bjelovacka is fully regulated into a canal due to its historical tendency to flood. Historically it formed swamp-like conditions east of Bjelovar.

In the vicinity of Bjelovacka, within the Lug forest, the remains of a larger Roman rural settlement have been found, as well as archaeological findings dating to antiquity of glass and ceramics.

== Fishing ==
There are various species of fish found in Bjelovacka, and it is a site of sport fishing. There are several fishing ponds next to it, the largest of which is the artificial lake of Lug near the forest of the same name, which is owned by ŠRD (In Croatian: Športsko ribolovno društvo) "Bjelovacka" Lug-Trojstveni Markovac.
