= Nove Plavnice =

- Neighbourhood
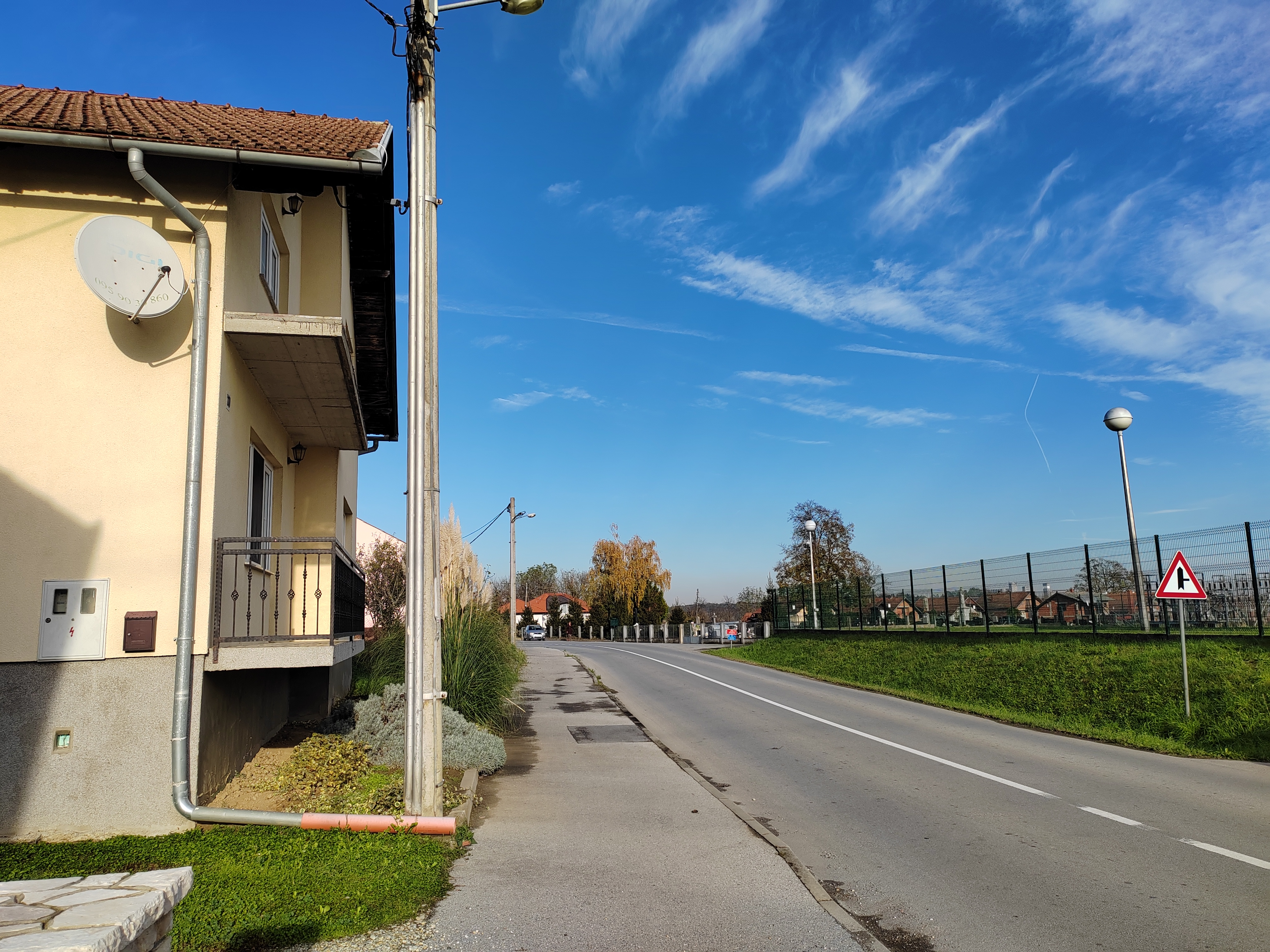
- Interactive map of Nove Plavnice
- Location of Nove Plavnice in Croatia
- Coordinates: 45°54′14″N 16°49′13″E
- Country: Croatia
- Region: Croatia proper
- County: Bjelovar-Bilogora County
- Municipality: Bjelovar
- Time zone: UTC+1 (CET)
  - Summer (DST): UTC+2 (CEST)

Nove Plavnice (Czech: Nové Plavnice) are a neighborhood and former settlement in the western part of the city of Bjelovar.The neighborhood extends east of the settlement of Klokočevac, south of Hrgovljani, west of the Plavnica river and north of the settlement of Stare Plavnice.

== Etymology ==
The name Nove Plavnice in Croatian directly translates to "New Plavnice", as opposed to Stare Plavnice (lit."Old Plavnice") from which the settlement of Nove Plavnice branches off.

The name Plavnica comes from the Plavnica or Plavnička river, whose name comes from Slavic roots related to blue or clear water. Before canalization and regulation of its watercourse, the Plavnica often historically flooded the surrounding area, and Croatian names with the root plav- are most often associated with the verb plaviti, which means to flow, wash away, or flood the surrounding land.

== History ==
In the Middle Ages, within the boundaries of the present-day settlement of Nove Plavnice, there existed a medieval parish of Saint Martin. The parish is mentioned in 1516 with a parish priest, Nikola. The same parish is also mentioned in a parish registry from 1501 as "Nowa Szent Marton" with a parish priest, named Brcko.

The present-day settlement of Nove Plavnice was established as a Czech colony in 1826 by the immigration of Czech families from the Sudetenland.The village was founded by five Czech families who settled on an undeveloped area within the village of Donje Plavnice (today Stare Plavnice) under the German name Neu Plawnicza within the municipality of Gudovac.

In 1925, Nove Plavnice, alongside the settlements of Velike Sredice, Male Sredice and Hrgovljani, were separated from the municipality of Gudovac and merged with the city of Bjelovar.

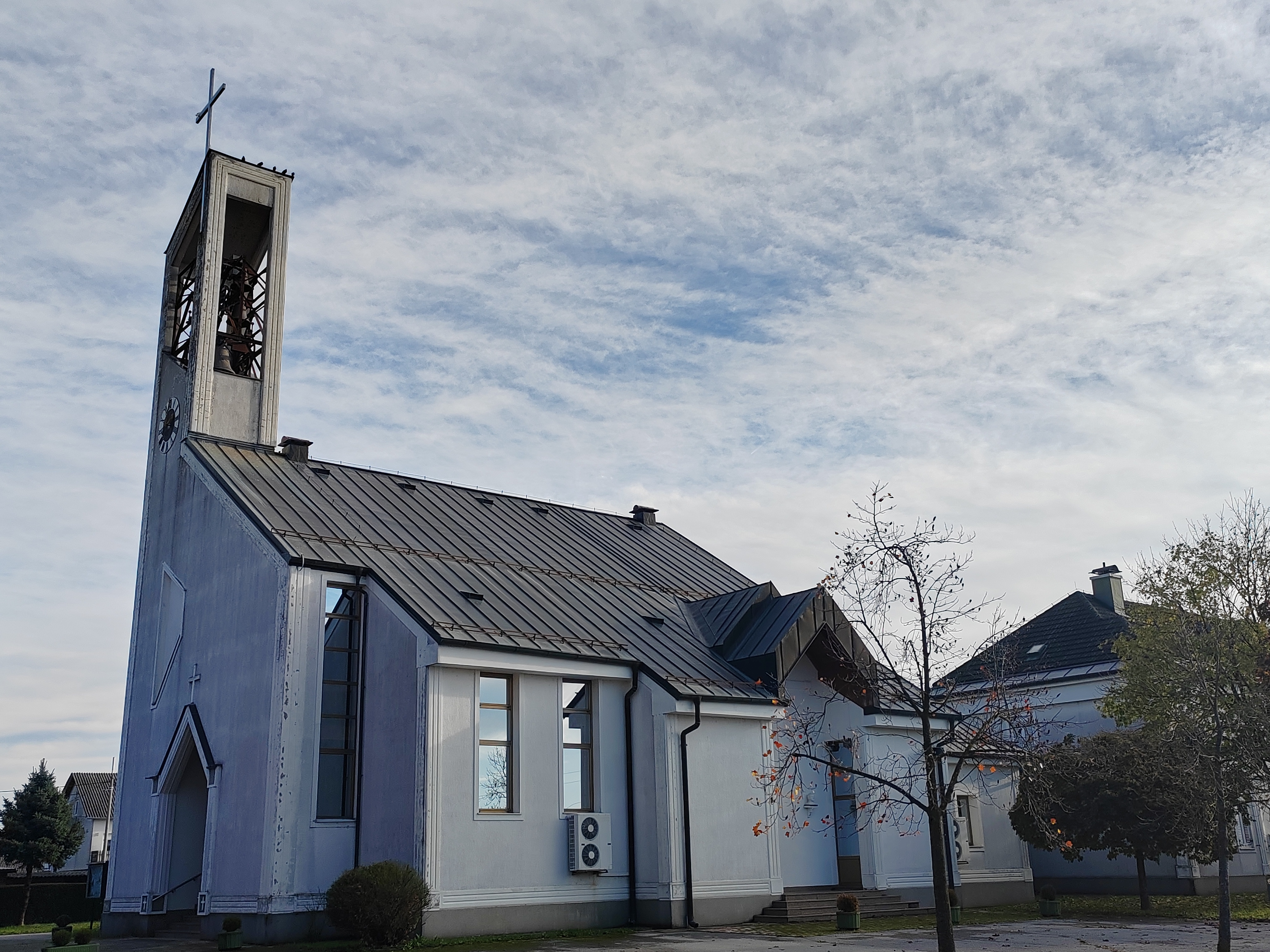
The Parish Church of St. Anne, built in 1993

In 1938, a Czech community center was built in Nove Plavnice, which was the only such community center within the Bjelovar region during the interwar period.

The community center was later repurposed into the current local community center, named the "Croatian home" (Croatian: Hrvatski dom). Until the 1950s, Nove Plavnice were inhabited almost exclusively by Czechs and people of Czech background.

After World War II and rapid urbanization, a new Statute of the Municipality of Bjelovar was proclaimed in 1974, signed by President Aleksandar Lamza on behalf of the Municipal Assembly. According to the new statute, certain outer settlements became been merged with the built-up area of the city of Bjelovar, whereby the settlements of Nove Plavnice, Hrgovljani, and Velike and Male Sredice ceased to be independent administrative settlements.

== Landmarks ==
- Parish Church of St. Anne
- Old district school building
- Chapel of St. Fabian and Sebastian on Križevci Road (Historically Chapel of St. Anne)
- Croatian Community Center (Historically Czech Home)
- Crucifix in the center of the settlement from 1894
