= Galovac =

Galovac may refer to:

- Galovac, Bjelovar-Bilogora County
- Galovac, Zadar County
- Galovac (island)
- Galovac, one of Plitvice Lakes
