= Stančići =

Stančići may refer to:

- Stančići, Serbia, a village near Čačak
- Stančići, Croatia, a village near Bjelovar
