= Rajić =

Rajić may refer to:

- Rajić (surname), a Slavic surname
- Rajić, Sisak-Moslavina County, a village near Novska, Croatia
- Rajić, Bjelovar-Bilogora County, a village near Bjelovar, Croatia
