= Malo Korenovo =

- Village
- Location within Croatia
- Coordinates: 45.8498384°N 16.8015267°E
- Country: Croatia
- County: Bjelovar-Bilogora County
- Municipality: Bjelovar

Area
  - Total: 1.2 sq mi (3.0 km^{2})

Population (2021)
  - Total: 190
  - Density: 160/sq mi (63/km^{2})
- Time zone: UTC+1 (CET)
  - Summer (DST): UTC+2 (CEST)

Malo Korenovo is a village in Croatia.

== Demographics ==
According to the 2021 census, its population was 190.
