= Božidar Puretić =

Božidar Puretić, M.D. (1921 – 1971) was a Croatian physician.

Born in Bjelovar, he earned his medical degree at the University of Zagreb in 1946. He was a professor at the pediatric clinic, University of Zagreb. In 1962, he described a case of juvenile hyaline fibromatosis as a unique form of mesenchymal dysplasia. This very rare disease had been first described in 1873 by Dr. John Murray, a physician at Middlesex Hospital, and termed molluscum fibrosum. Few cases were subsequently reported and it had become almost forgotten before Puretić's case. The disease is sometimes referred to as Murray-Puretic-Drescher syndrome. He died in Zagreb.
