= Patkovac =

- Village
- Location within Croatia
- Coordinates: 45.8527716°N 16.9063354°E
- Country: Croatia
- County: Bjelovar-Bilogora County
- Municipality: Bjelovar

Area
  - Total: 1.8 sq mi (4.6 km^{2})

Population (2021)
  - Total: 210
  - Density: 120/sq mi (46/km^{2})
- Time zone: UTC+1 (CET)
  - Summer (DST): UTC+2 (CEST)

Patkovac is a village in Croatia.

== Demographics ==
According to the 2021 census, its population was 210.
