= Bilogora =

Mountain range in Central Croatia

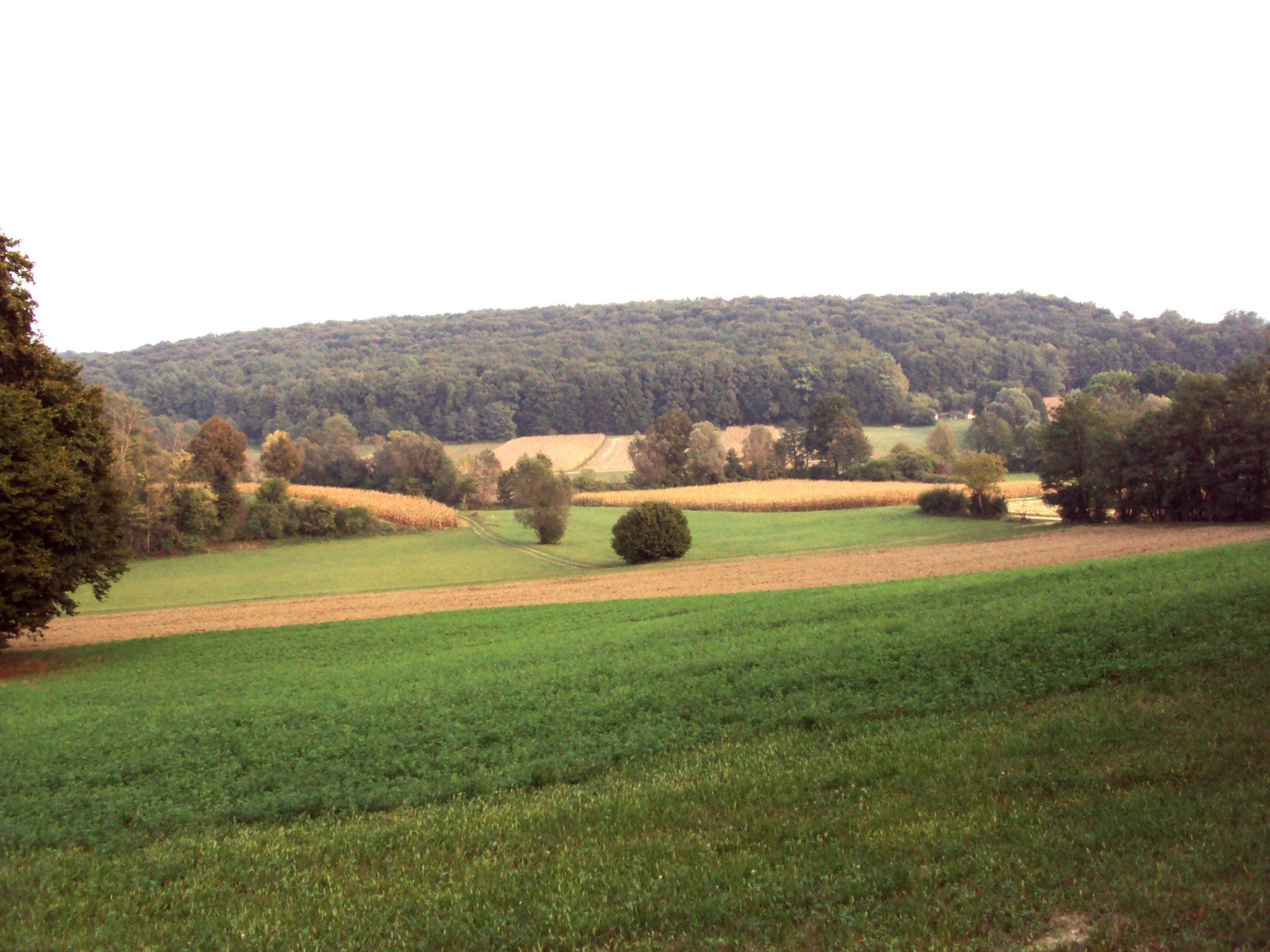
- Bilogora in Puričani, north of Bjelovar

Highest point
- Elevation: 309 m (1,014 ft)
- Listing: List of mountains in Croatia
- Coordinates: 45°48′N 17°12′E

Geography
- Location within Croatia
- Location: Croatia Proper, Croatia

Bilogora (Note: Also known as Bilo-gora, Bilogorje or Bilo-gorje. Historically also known as Međurečka gora) (English: Ridge Hills) is a low mountainous range and a microregion in Central Croatia. It consists of a series of hills and small plains some 80 kilometres in length stretching in the direction northwest–southeast, along the southwest part of the Podravina region. The highest peak is called Rajčevica (309 m), located in the north of the mountain.

The area lends its name to the Bjelovar-Bilogora County, one of the 21 counties of Croatia with its seat in the nearby city of Bjelovar. The mountain is also shared with Koprivnica-Križevci County as well as Virovitica-Podravina County.

Bilogora is geographically located between the rivers of Drava and Sava and is the source of the rivers Česma, Glogovnica and Ilova. Bilogora is considered to be the lowest mountainous region in Croatia, but is also the largest in terms of area. It serves as a drainage divide separating the drainage basins of the Sava and Drava rivers.

== Name ==
In Hungarian the range is known as Bilo-hegység.

The old name for today's Bilogora was Međurečka gora, meaning the mountain between rivers.The old name came from Bilogoras position dividing the Sava and Drava river basins. The actual origin of the modern name of Bilogora is disputed, however there are several assumptions and theories.

The mountain is interwoven with numerous mountain slopes, ridges and clearings which in Croatian are known as "bilo".

Hinko Hranilović also wrote that "the name of Bilogora could come from the white and gray soil, which is formed by marls and sands, giving it the name "Bijela gora" or "Bjelogora" meaning white mountain, Which could indicate the origins of the name Bilogora could be extremely similar to the city of Bjelovar to its south.

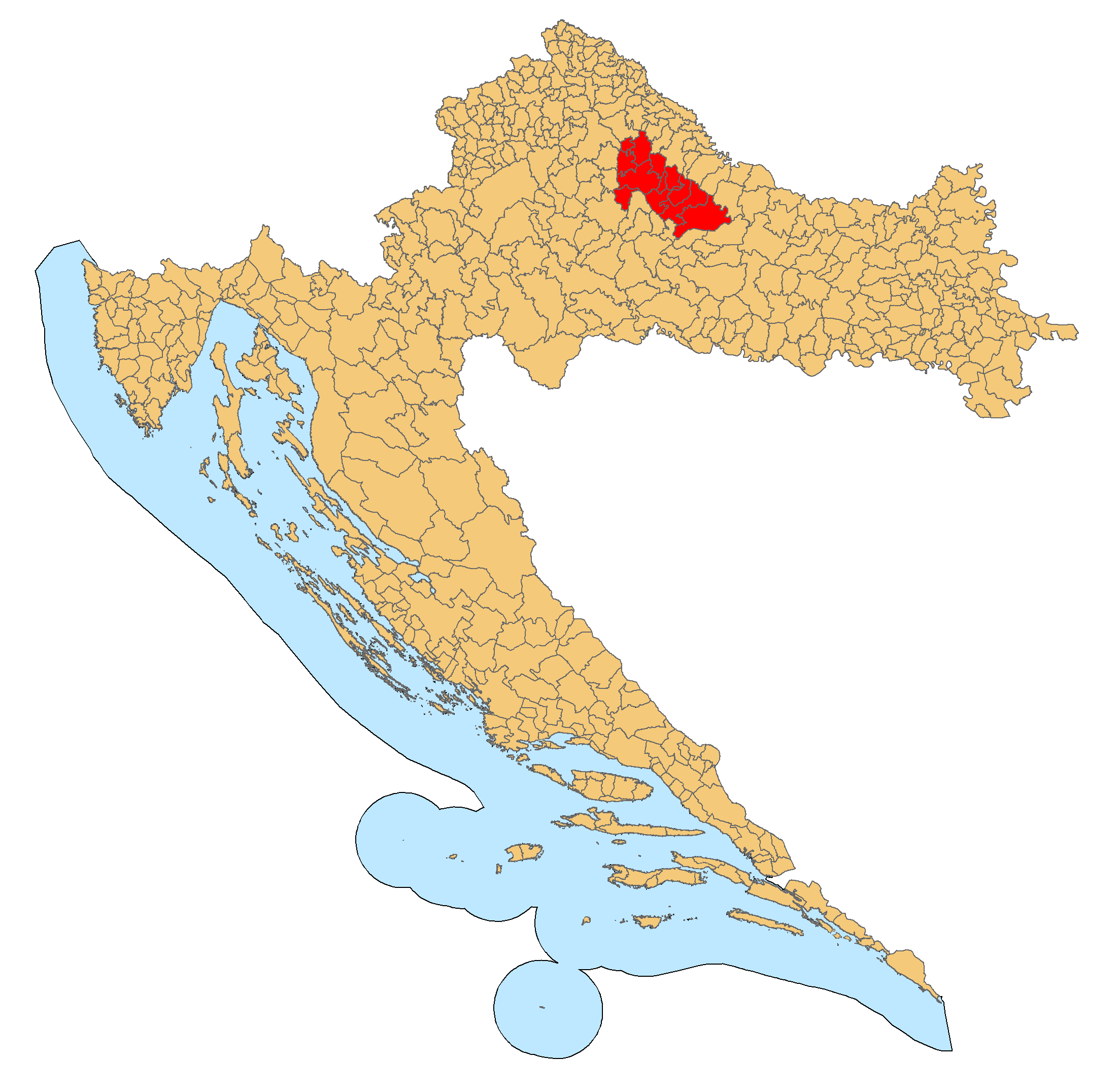
Bilogora microregion including the city of Bjelovar and town of Grubišno Polje.

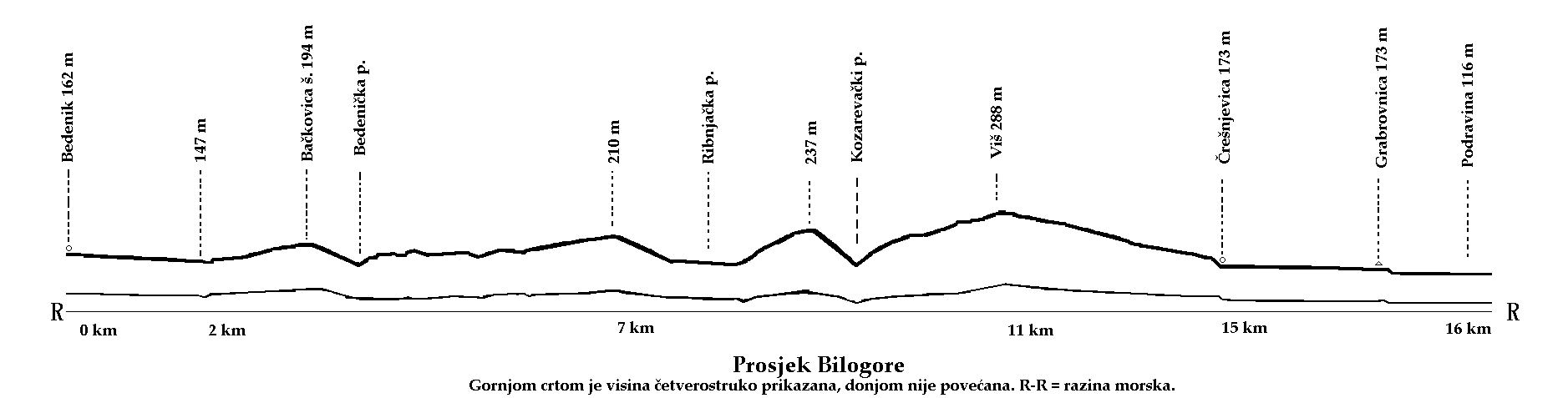
Illustration of the form of Bilogora, including the average width and heights

The Croatian Meteorological and Hydrological Service has a measuring station on Bilogora.

== Climate ==
Since records began in 1981, the highest temperature recorded at the Bilogora station at an elevation of 259 metres (850 ft) was 39.8 °C (103.6 °F), on 24 August 2012. The coldest temperature was −20.4 °C (−4.7 °F), on 21 February 1978.

== Bibliography ==
=== Alpinism ===
- Poljak, Željko (February 1959). "Bilo-gora". Kazalo za "Hrvatski planinar" i "Naše planine" 1898—1958 (PDF). Naše planine. Vol. XI. p. 6. ISSN 0354-0650.

=== Geology ===
- Lozić, Sanja; Fuerst-Bjeliš, Borna; Perica, Dražen (2006-06-01). "Quantitative-geomorphological and Environmental-historical Impact of the Ecological Soil Depth; Northwestern Croatia". Hrvatski geografski glasnik. 68 (1): 7–25. doi:10.21861/HGG.2006.68.01.01. eISSN 1848-6401.

=== Meteorology ===
- Počakal, Damir (2005-12-15). "Influence of Orography on Hail Characteristics in the Continental Part of Croatia". Hrvatski meteorološki časopis (40): 641–642. ISSN 1330-0083.
