= Stari Pavljani =

- Village
- Location within Croatia
- Coordinates: 45.8560855°N 16.8588674°E
- Country: Croatia
- County: Bjelovar-Bilogora County
- Municipality: Bjelovar

Area
  - Total: 2.0 sq mi (5.3 km^{2})

Population (2021)
  - Total: 191
  - Density: 93/sq mi (36/km^{2})
- Time zone: UTC+1 (CET)
  - Summer (DST): UTC+2 (CEST)

Stari Pavljani is a village in Croatia.

== Demographics ==
According to the 2021 census, its population was 191.
