= Novi Pavljani =

- Village
- Location within Croatia
- Coordinates: 45.8559723°N 16.8416926°E
- Country: Croatia
- County: Bjelovar-Bilogora County
- Municipality: Bjelovar

Area
  - Total: 0.81 sq mi (2.1 km^{2})

Population (2021)
  - Total: 136
  - Density: 170/sq mi (65/km^{2})
- Time zone: UTC+1 (CET)
  - Summer (DST): UTC+2 (CEST)

Novi Pavljani is a village in Croatia.

== Demographics ==
According to the 2021 census, its population was 136.
