= Mala Ciglena =

- Village
- Location within Croatia
- Coordinates: 45.8934004°N 16.9313815°E
- Country: Croatia
- County: Bjelovar-Bilogora County
- Municipality: Bjelovar

Area
  - Total: 0.58 sq mi (1.5 km^{2})

Population (2021)
  - Total: 10
  - Density: 17/sq mi (6.7/km^{2})
- Time zone: UTC+1 (CET)
  - Summer (DST): UTC+2 (CEST)

Mala Ciglena is a village in Croatia.

== Demographics ==
According to the 2021 census, its population was 10.
