= Zvijerci =

- Village
- Location within Croatia
- Country: Croatia
- County: Bjelovar-Bilogora County
- Municipality: Bjelovar

Area
  - Total: 0.73 sq mi (1.9 km^{2})

Population (2021)
  - Total: 59
  - Density: 80/sq mi (31/km^{2})
- Time zone: UTC+1 (CET)
  - Summer (DST): UTC+2 (CEST)

Zvijerci is a village in Croatia.

== Demographics ==
According to the 2021 census, its population was 59.
