= Gornje Plavnice =

- Village
- Location within Croatia
- Coordinates: 45°56′25″N 16°51′19″E
- Country: Croatia
- County: Bjelovar-Bilogora County
- Municipality: Bjelovar

Area
  - Total: 4.0 sq mi (10.4 km^{2})
- Elevation: 522 ft (159 m)

Population (2021)
  - Total: 635
  - Density: 158/sq mi (61.1/km^{2})
- Time zone: UTC+1 (CET)
  - Summer (DST): UTC+2 (CEST)
- Postal code: 43000 Bjelovar
- Area code: 043
- Vehicle registration: BJ

Gornje Plavnice is a village in Croatia.

== Demographics ==
According to the 2021 census, its population was 635. It was 687 in 2011.
