= Galovac, Bjelovar-Bilogora County =

Galovac
- Village
- Location within Croatia
- Coordinates: 45.843844°N 16.852512°E
- Country: Croatia
- County: Bjelovar-Bilogora County
- Municipality: Bjelovar

Area
  - Total: 3.6 sq mi (9.3 km^{2})

Population (2021)
  - Total: 358
  - Density: 100/sq mi (38/km^{2})
- Time zone: UTC+1 (CET)
  - Summer (DST): UTC+2 (CEST)

Galovac is a village in Croatia.

== Demographics ==
According to the 2021 census, its population was 358. It was 457 in 2011.
