= Brezovac, Bjelovar-Bilogora County =

Brezovac
- Village
- Location within Croatia
- Coordinates: 45.8706822°N 16.8238459°E
- Country: Croatia
- County: Bjelovar-Bilogora County
- Municipality: Bjelovar

Area
  - Total: 2.7 sq mi (7.1 km^{2})

Population (2021)
  - Total: 994
  - Density: 360/sq mi (140/km^{2})
- Time zone: UTC+1 (CET)
  - Summer (DST): UTC+2 (CEST)

Brezovac is a village in Croatia.

== Demographics ==
According to the 2021 census, its population was 994.
