= Stare Plavnice =

- Village
- Location within Croatia
- Coordinates: 45°56′39″N 16°48′30″E
- Country: Croatia
- County: Bjelovar-Bilogora County
- Municipality: Bjelovar

Area
  - Total: 5.3 km^{2} (2.0 sq mi)
- Elevation: 122 m (400 ft)

Population (2021)
  - Total: 578
  - Density: 110/km^{2} (280/sq mi)
- Time zone: UTC+1 (CET)
  - Summer (DST): UTC+2 (CEST)
- Postal code: 43000 Bjelovar
- Area code: 043
- Vehicle registration: BJ

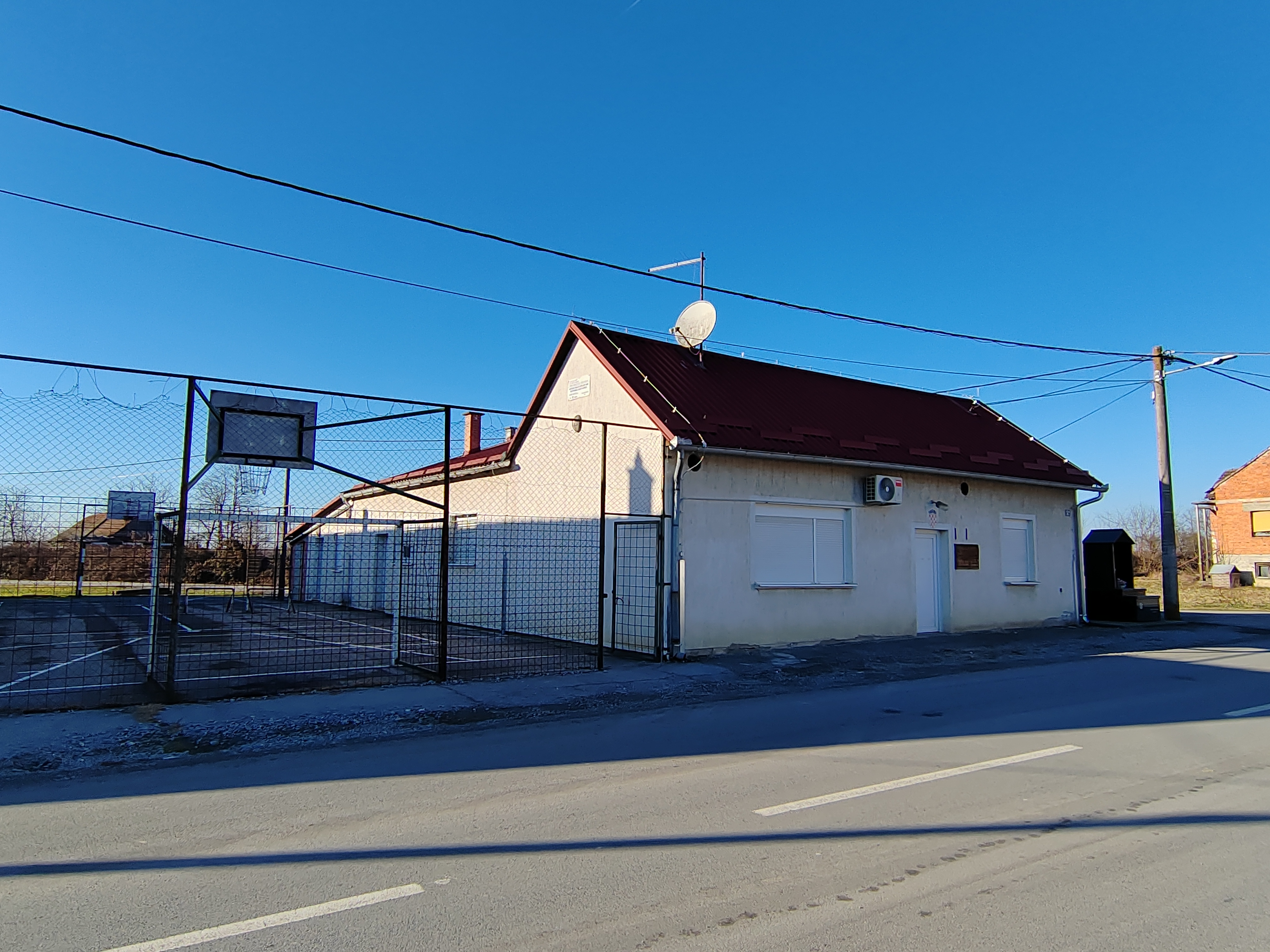
Building in Stare Plavnice

Stare Plavnice is a village in Croatia.

== Demographics ==
According to the 2021 census, its population was 578. It was 690 in 2001.
