= Rajić, Bjelovar-Bilogora County =

Rajić
- Village
- Location within Croatia
- Coordinates: 45.9012738°N 16.6984002°E
- Country: Croatia
- County: Bjelovar-Bilogora County
- Municipality: Bjelovar

Area
  - Total: 1.5 sq mi (4.0 km^{2})

Population (2021)
  - Total: 178
  - Density: 120/sq mi (44/km^{2})
- Time zone: UTC+1 (CET)
  - Summer (DST): UTC+2 (CEST)

Rajić is a village in Croatia.

== Demographics ==
According to the 2021 census, its population was 178.
