= Novoseljani =

- Village
- Location within Croatia
- Country: Croatia
- County: Bjelovar-Bilogora County
- Municipality: Bjelovar

Area
  - Total: 1.3 sq mi (3.4 km^{2})

Population (2021)
  - Total: 600
  - Density: 460/sq mi (180/km^{2})
- Time zone: UTC+1 (CET)
  - Summer (DST): UTC+2 (CEST)

Novoseljani is a suburb of the city of Bjelovar

== Demographics ==
According to the 2021 census, its population was 600.
