= Klokočevac (Bjelovar) =

- Village
- Location within Croatia
- Coordinates: 45°54′47″N 16°46′48″E
- Country: Croatia
- County: Bjelovar-Bilogora County
- Municipality: Bjelovar

Area
  - Total: 5.5 km^{2} (2.1 sq mi)
- Elevation: 124 m (407 ft)

Population (2021)
  - Total: 938
  - Density: 170/km^{2} (440/sq mi)
- Time zone: UTC+1 (CET)
  - Summer (DST): UTC+2 (CEST)
- Postal code: 43211 Predavac
- Area code: 043
- Vehicle registration: BJ

Klokočevac is a suburb of the city of Bjelovar

== Demographics ==
According to the 2021 census, its population was 938. It was 864 in 2011.
