= Puričani =

- Village
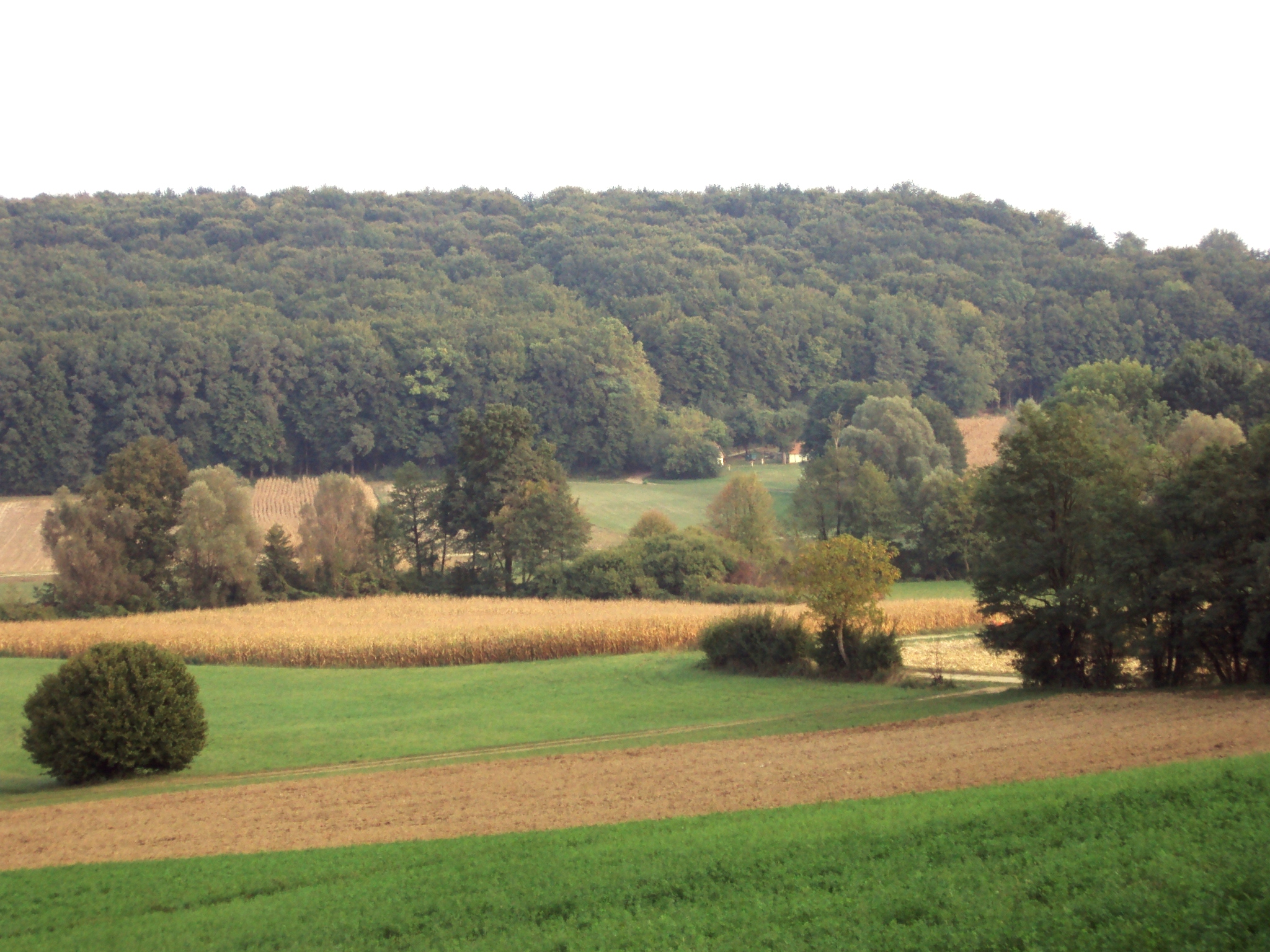

- Location within Croatia
- Coordinates: 45.9216458°N 16.8844251°E
- Country: Croatia
- County: Bjelovar-Bilogora County
- Municipality: Bjelovar

Area
  - Total: 0.54 sq mi (1.4 km^{2})

Population (2021)
  - Total: 151
  - Density: 280/sq mi (110/km^{2})
- Time zone: UTC+1 (CET)
  - Summer (DST): UTC+2 (CEST)

Puričani is a village in Croatia.

== Demographics ==
According to the 2021 census, its population was 151.
