= Stančići, Croatia =

Stančići
- Village
- Location within Croatia
- Coordinates: 45.9043227°N 16.7330272°E
- Country: Croatia
- County: Bjelovar-Bilogora County
- Municipality: Bjelovar

Area
  - Total: 0.66 sq mi (1.7 km^{2})

Population (2021)
  - Total: 72
  - Density: 110/sq mi (42/km^{2})
- Time zone: UTC+1 (CET)
  - Summer (DST): UTC+2 (CEST)

Stančići is a village in Croatia.

== Demographics ==
According to the 2021 census, its population was 72.
