= Veliko Korenovo =

- Village
- Location within Croatia
- Country: Croatia
- County: Bjelovar-Bilogora County
- Municipality: Bjelovar

Area
  - Total: 3.7 sq mi (9.5 km^{2})

Population (2021)
  - Total: 461
  - Density: 130/sq mi (49/km^{2})
- Time zone: UTC+1 (CET)
  - Summer (DST): UTC+2 (CEST)

Veliko Korenovo is a rural suburb of the city of Bjelovar.

== Demographics ==
According to the 2021 census, its population was 461.
