= Prokljuvani, Bjelovar =

Prokljuvani
- Village
- Location within Croatia
- Coordinates: 45.9054626°N 16.8927469°E
- Country: Croatia
- County: Bjelovar-Bilogora County
- Municipality: Bjelovar

Area
  - Total: 0.69 sq mi (1.8 km^{2})

Population (2021)
  - Total: 217
  - Density: 310/sq mi (120/km^{2})
- Time zone: UTC+1 (CET)
  - Summer (DST): UTC+2 (CEST)

Prokljuvani is a village in Croatia.

== Demographics ==
According to the 2021 census, its population was 217.
