= Bjelovar =

City in Bjelovar-Bilogora County, Croatia

- City
- Grad Bjelovar; City of Bjelovar
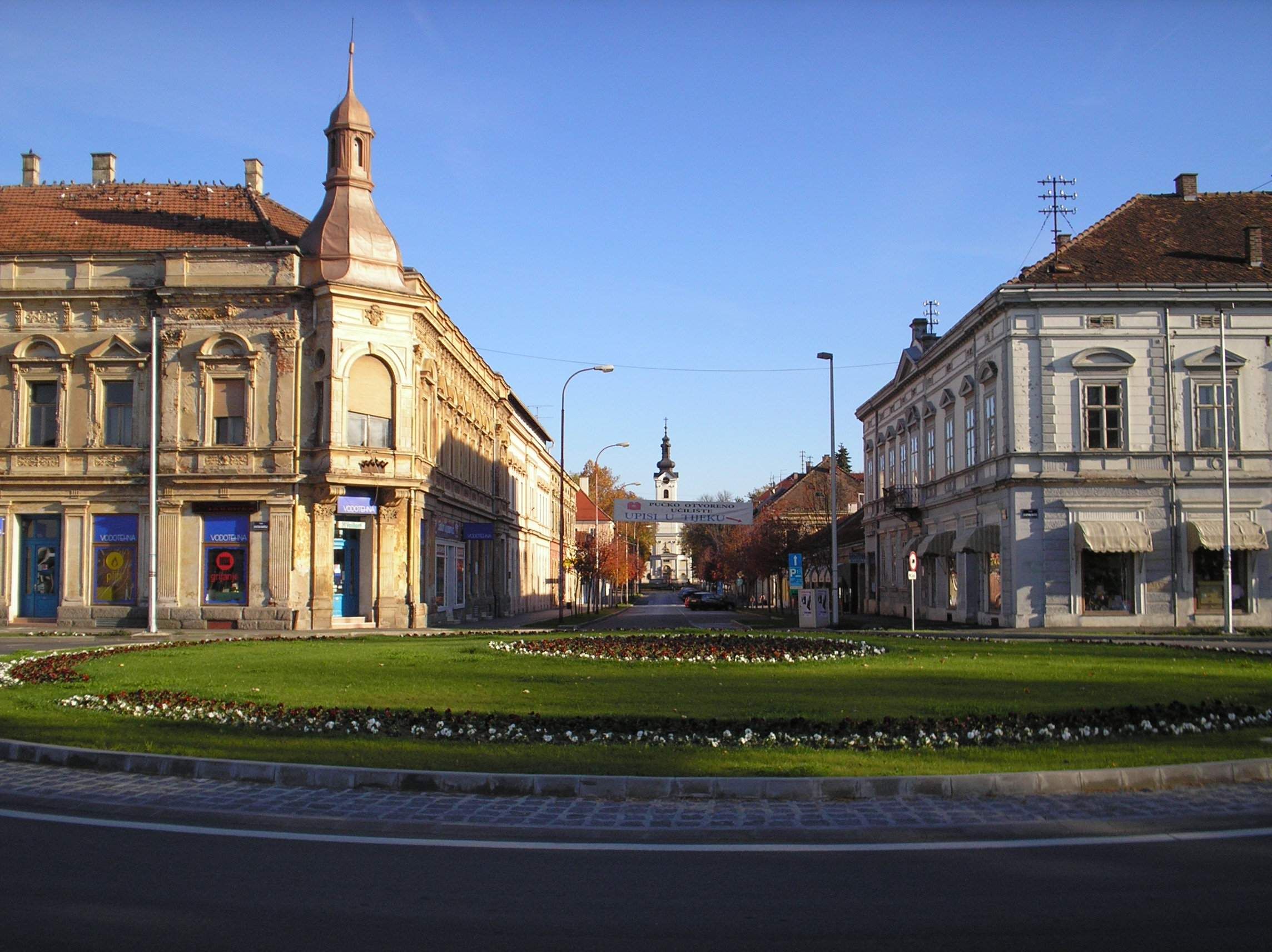
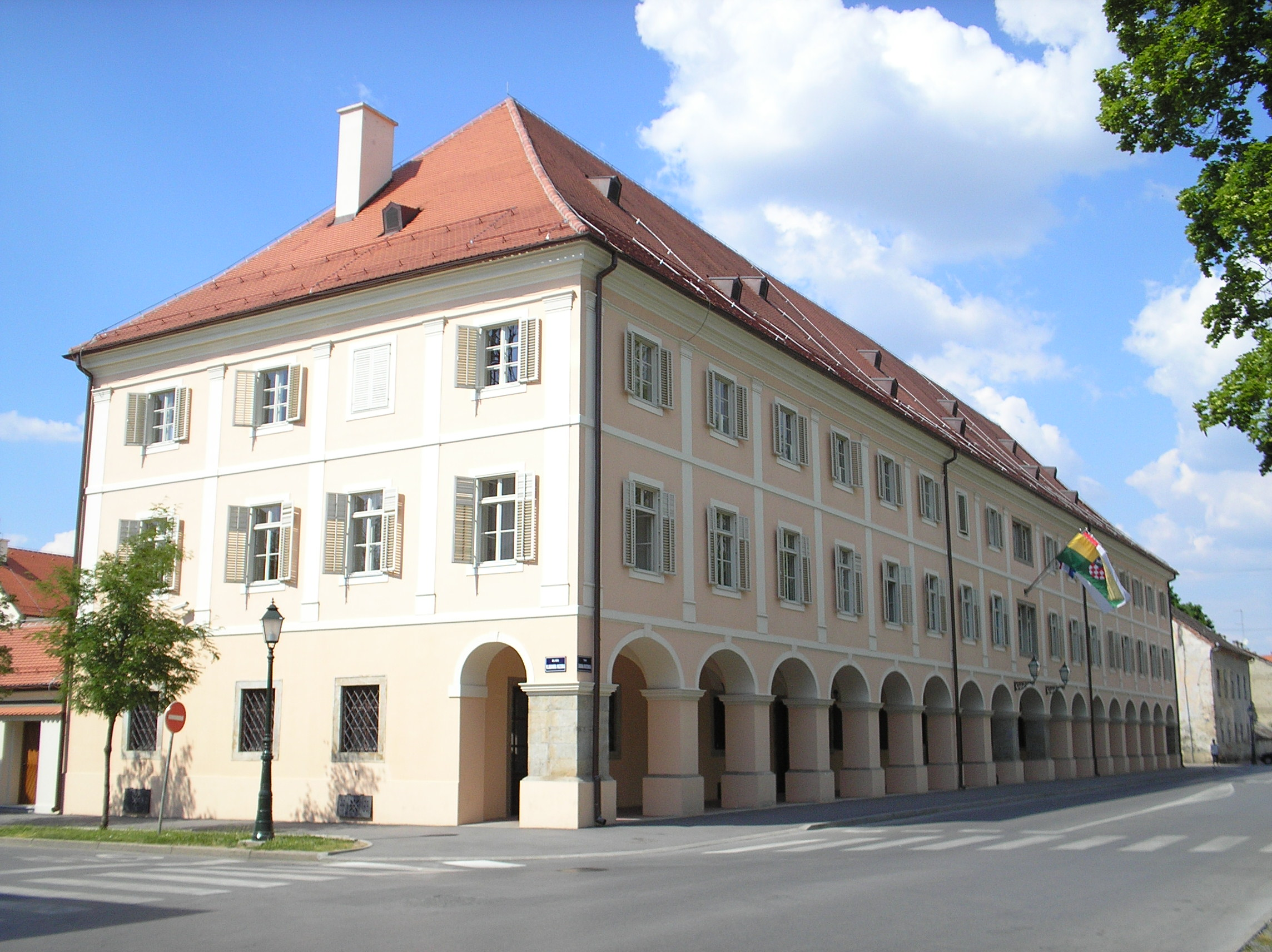
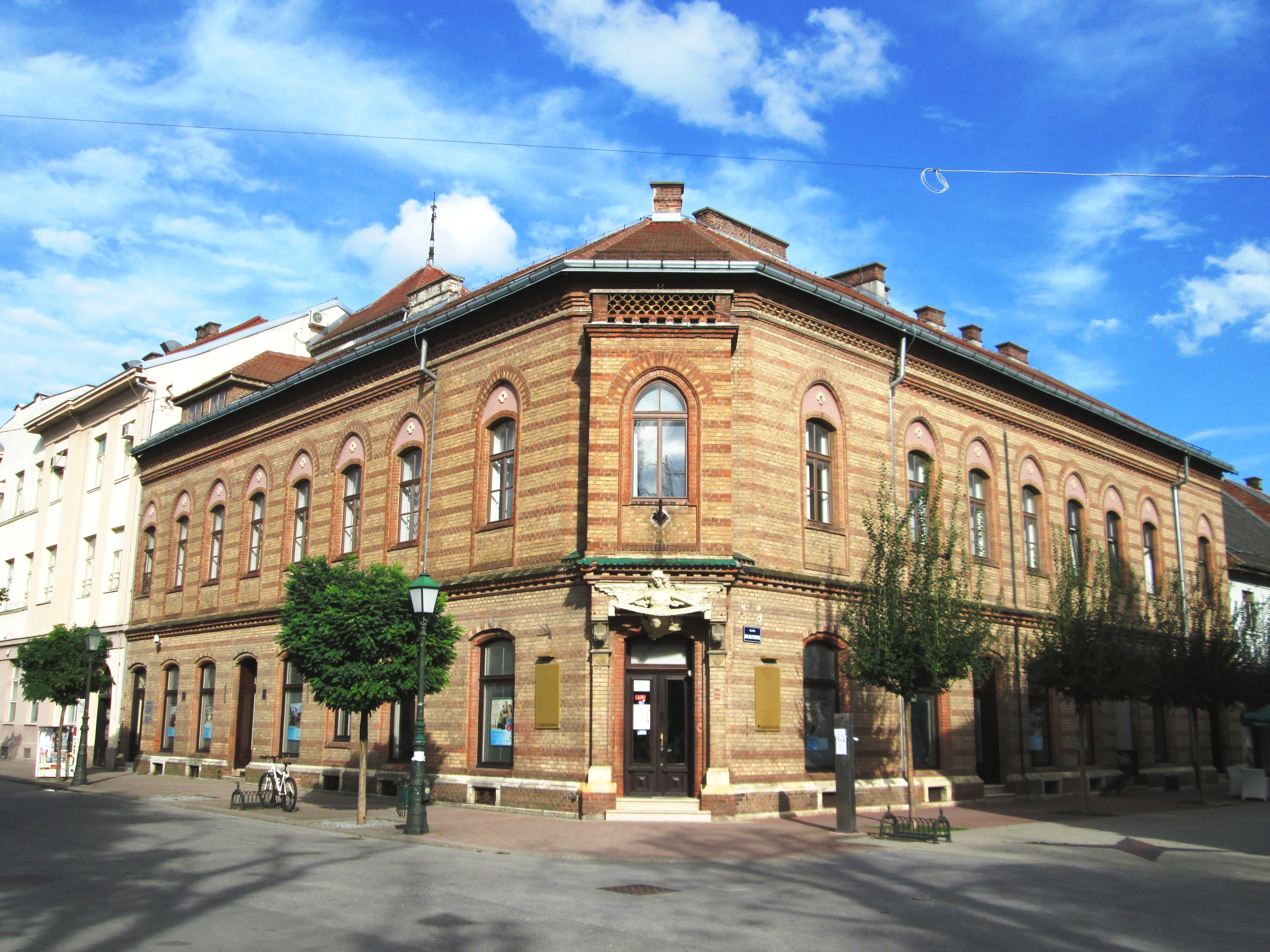
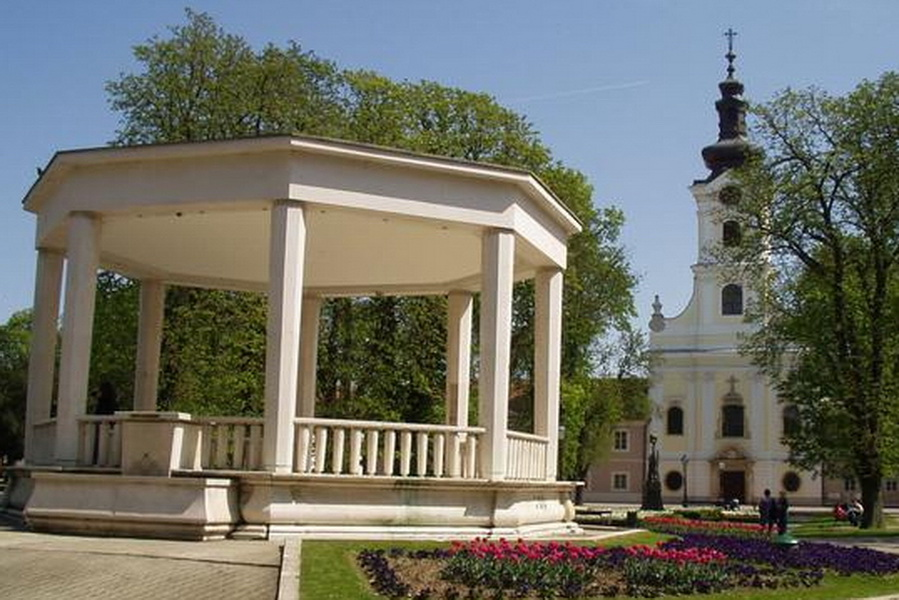
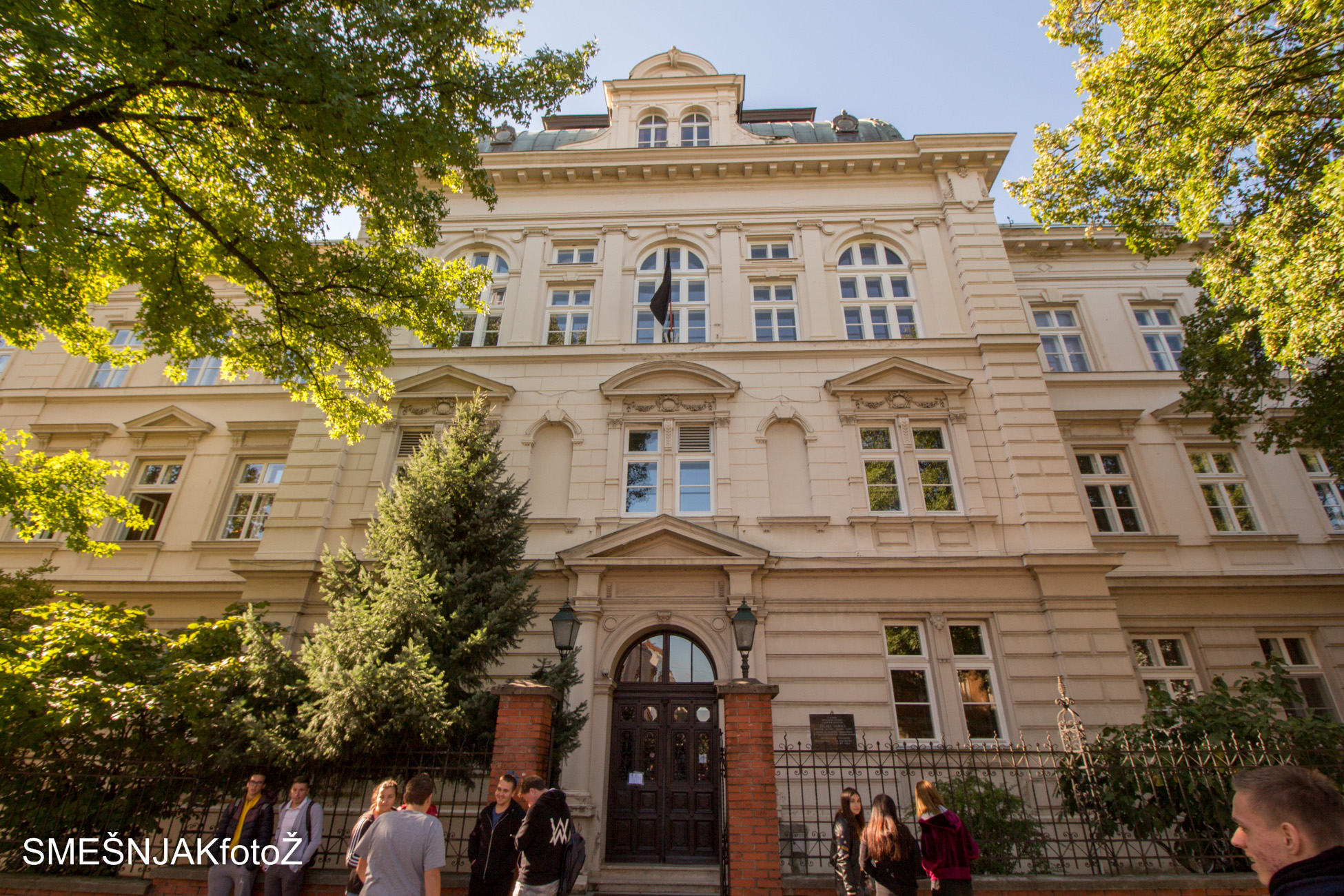
- Bjelovar and it's attractions with Bjelovar Cathedral

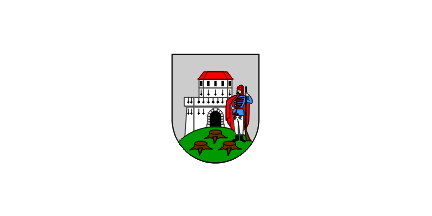
- Flag Coat of arms
- Nicknames: Grad sira (City of cheese), Bilogorska metropola (Bilogora Metropolis)
- Interactive map of Bjelovar
- Location of Bjelovar in Croatia
- Coordinates: 45°54′N 16°50′E
- Country: Croatia
- Region: Central Croatia (Bilogora)
- County: Bjelovar-Bilogora County

Government
  - Mayor: Dario Hrebak (HSLS)
  - City Council: 21 members: HSLS (10); DBNL, HNS, HSU, R, HSS, GLAS (4); HDZ (3); DP (2); Centre, D (1); SDP (1)

Area
  - City: 187.9 km^{2} (72.5 sq mi)
  - Urban: 23.9 km^{2} (9.2 sq mi)
- Elevation: 135 m (443 ft)

Population (2021)
  - City: 36,316
  - Density: 193.3/km^{2} (500.6/sq mi)
  - Urban: 24,392
  - Urban density: 1,020/km^{2} (2,640/sq mi)
- Demonym(s): Bjelovarian (en); Bjelovarčanin (hr, male); Bjelovarčanka (hr, female)
- Time zone: UTC+1 (CET)
  - Summer (DST): UTC+2 (CEST)
- Postal code: 43000
- Area code: 043
- Vehicle registration: BJ
- Climate: Humid continental climate (Dfa)
- Website: bjelovar.hr

Bjelovar (Hungarian: Belovár, German: Bellowar, Czech: Bělovar or Bělovár, Kajkavian: Belovar, Latin: Bellovarium) is a city in the central Croatia, the administrative centre of Bjelovar-Bilogora County and bishoporic seat of the Diocese of Bjelovar-Križevci.

In the 2021 census, its population was 36,316.

== Name ==
The origin of the modern name Bjelovar is a topic of debate; however, a prominent theory posits that the name is derived from the concept of "white land", a term historically used to describe land that was challenging to cultivate. Older records of names like Belublathya or Bjeloblaće (i.e. "white mud"), indicate this possibility.

The name of the city itself consists of the Croatian adjective bijel, meaning 'white', added to the Hungarian word vár or város, which roughly translates to 'city' or 'fortress'.

=== Name history ===
The name of a settlement similar to Bjelovar is mentioned several times in various historical records. In a letter dating to 13 April 1465, Belovarc (Belowarcz) was mentioned by the bans Emeric Zápolya and Nicholas of Ilok, addressed to the archbishop of Zagreb, about the return of said property, and in the archbishops reply to their letter.

In 1473, in a letter, King Matthias Corvinus gifted the properties of so-called "Belublathy" to several nobles.

In other documents from that period, the names Belowarcz, Beloblatje, and Bjeloblaće are mentioned. The same names are also mentioned around the years 1579 to 1611, where a small fortress or schloss was built along the Bjelovacka to defend against oncoming Turkish invasions. This fortress is recorded on various maps as a fortress: Belouac, Belouax, and Wellovar.

In 1756, with the establishment of the modern city and its subsequent promotion to the military center of the Varaždin Generalate, which was commanded by Baron Philipp Lewin von Beck. Bjelovar was founded and named as Novi Varaždin (lit. 'New Varaždin'), which the local population did not accept. Beck ordered that those who do not accept the name Novi Varaždin be punished.

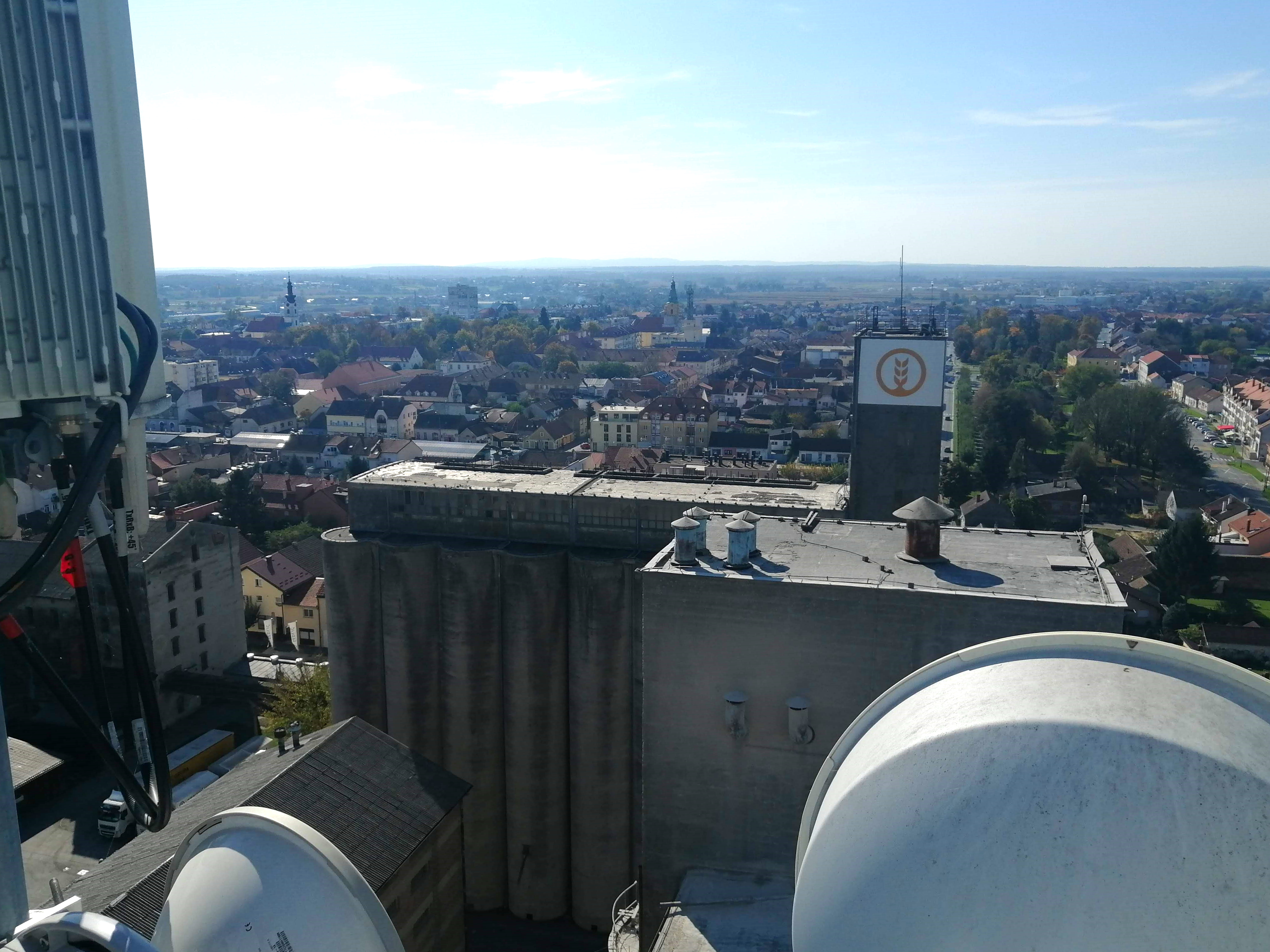
Panoramic view of the city atop the Bjelovar silo tower

== Geography ==
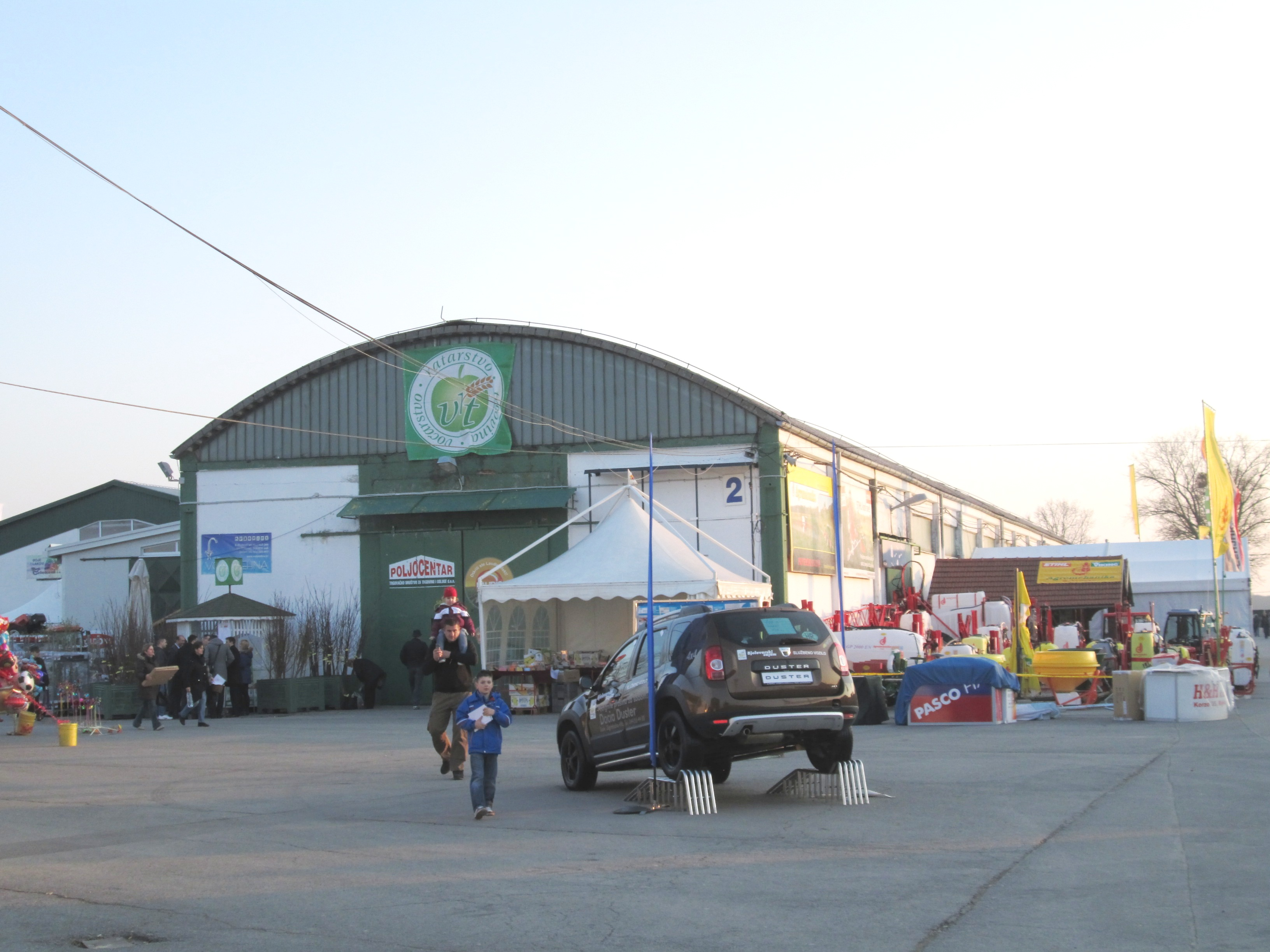
Bjelovar agricultural fair

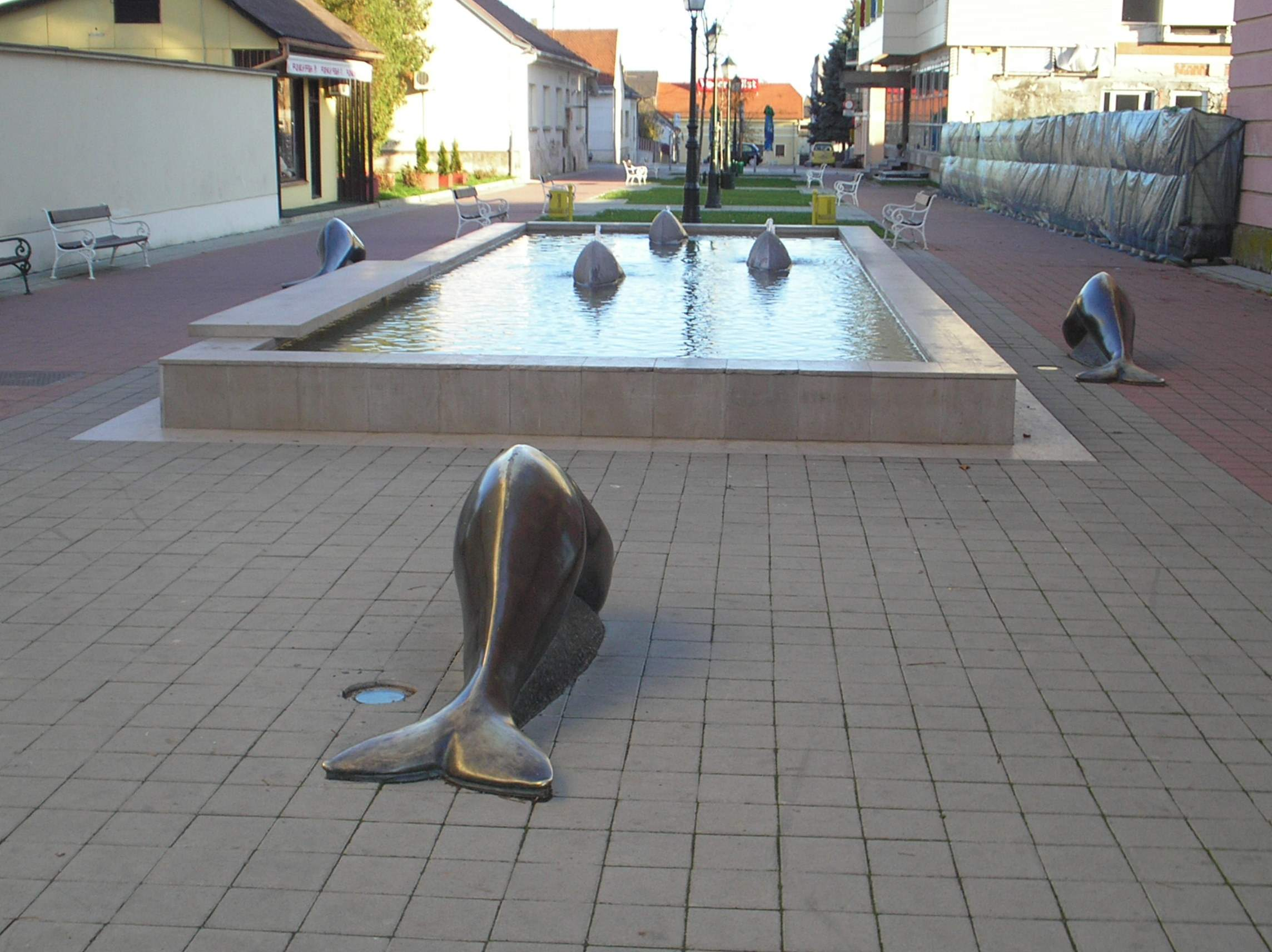
"Return of the Pannonian whales" fountain

Bjelovar sits on a plateau in the southern part of the Bilogora, a long, low elevation range with an average height of 150–200 m (highest point: Rajčevica, 309 m). The geology of the area consists of Pliocene sandy marl and sandstones with lesser layers of lignite. Older rocks do not appear on the surface in this area. Deeper down, crystalline rocks can be found. The city stands 135 meters above sea level. It is the capital of the Bjelovar-Bilogora county, and the natural, cultural, and political centre of the area.

Bjelovar sits at an intersection of roads in this area: the D28 intersects with the D43, and it lies on the road between Zagreb and west Slavonia, Podravina, and Osijek. Bjelovar is currently being connected by dual carriageway with Zagreb.

The city of Bjelovar has an area of 181.75 km^{2} (70.2 sq mi) and administratively includes 31 other settlements.

== History ==
=== Neolithic and ancient history ===
The oldest Neolithic location in this area is in Ždralovi, a suburb of Bjelovar, where, while building a basement for the house of Josip Horvatić, a dugout was found and identified as belonging to the Starčevo culture (5000 – 4300 BC). Finds from Ždralovi belong to a regional subtype of a late variant of the Neolithic culture. It is designated the Ždralovi facies of the Starčevo culture, or the final-stage Starčevo. There are also relics of the Korenovo culture, Sopot culture, Lasinja culture, and Vučedol culture, as well as the Bronze and Iron Age cultures, which are found in the wider Bjelovar area.

==== Roman Empire ====
The more intensive development of the area began with the arrival of the Romans, who first came to the area between the Sava and Drava rivers in 229 BC. The intersection of two Roman roads was located exactly at the place where present-day Bjelovar developed, and in its immediate vicinity was a presumed military camp or station.

With the stabilization of the northern border of the Roman Empire, a collection of settlements probably developed here in the period from the second to fourth centuries, unrecorded on Roman itineraries but attested by archaeological remains in today's Matošev Square, Stjepan Radić Square, and findings in the wider city area, such as a Roman rural settlement in the forest and area of Lug.

=== Origin of the city ===
By the end of the 14th and beginning of the 15th century, many noble and church estates were located within the circle of modern Bjelovar, examples being the settlement Jakobove Sredice, the fort of Gudovačka Gradina, and church parishes in modern-day Veliko Korenovo, Međurača, and Nova Rača.

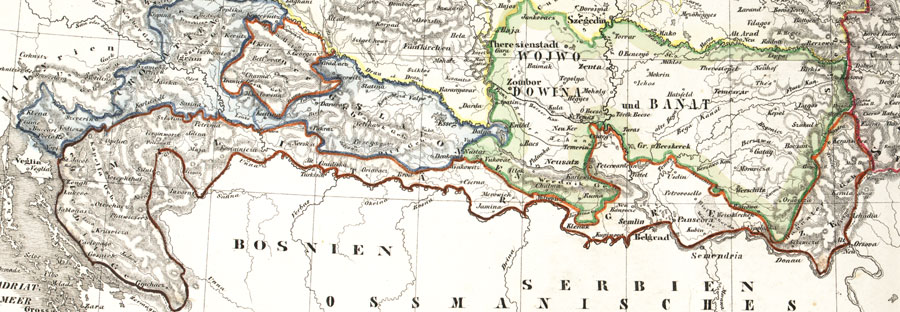
The military frontier with the Varaždin Generalate, the center of which was the newly established Bjelovar

With the Turkish invasions in the 16th century, the modern-day Bjelovar region became a border area and a humanly and materially devastated region that constantly changed hands. The population had dispersed and life was largely carried out in small forts along the unstable border with the Ottomans. Only with the establishment of an administrative and military system of defense against the Turks, better known as the Croatian Military Frontier, within which the Bjelovar area was located, did the situation stabilize. In the 17th century, Bjelovar is mentioned as a military guardhouse, which indicates that it was already included in the frontier defense system at that point. Stabilization of the Habsburg-Ottoman border on the Sava river and the new circumstances of the society in the region during the first half of the 18th century conditioned the territorial and administrative reorganization of the Varaždin Generalate.

The Severin Uprising, also known as the Varaždin rebellion of 1755, which took place in the immediate vicinity of the future city, pointed to the need for a new command center from which the Krajišan could demonstrate better control. Viennese military strategists decided to establish a new settlement that would take over the function of headquarters of regimental administrations. A location was chosen in the center of the generalate, on the dividing line between the Križevci and Đurđevac regiments.

The foundation of Bjelovar and the beginning of its construction dates back to 1756, when the land was purchased and a permit was issued for the purchase of building materials. The construction was led by Baron Philipp Lewin von Beck. From the very beginning, the city was conceived as the center of the Varaždin Generalate, and in accordance with the military function, the construction of military facilities and the settlement of the military population began, as well as the resettlement of many Czech and Croatian peasants as workforce on the new fort.

The exception is the block on the square where the parish church of St. Teresa of Avila (now the Cathedral of St. Teresa of Avila) and the Piarist monastery and school sit. Two Piarist monks, brothers Hubert and Ignacije Diviš, came to Bjelovar in 1761 and opened the first public school on the Đurđevac regiment side of town. By the decision of Empress Maria Theresa, construction of a new church started, which was completed in 1772. With this, the parish of Bjelovar was established, and until 1790, it was managed by Piarists. In 1771, Maria Theresa confirmed Bjelovar's status as a privileged "Krajina city", a military community, which resulted in demographic and significant economic growth. This trend continued at the beginning of the 19th century, when the city began to expand beyond its original borders. With time, it became the administrative centre of the Bjelovar-Križevci County.

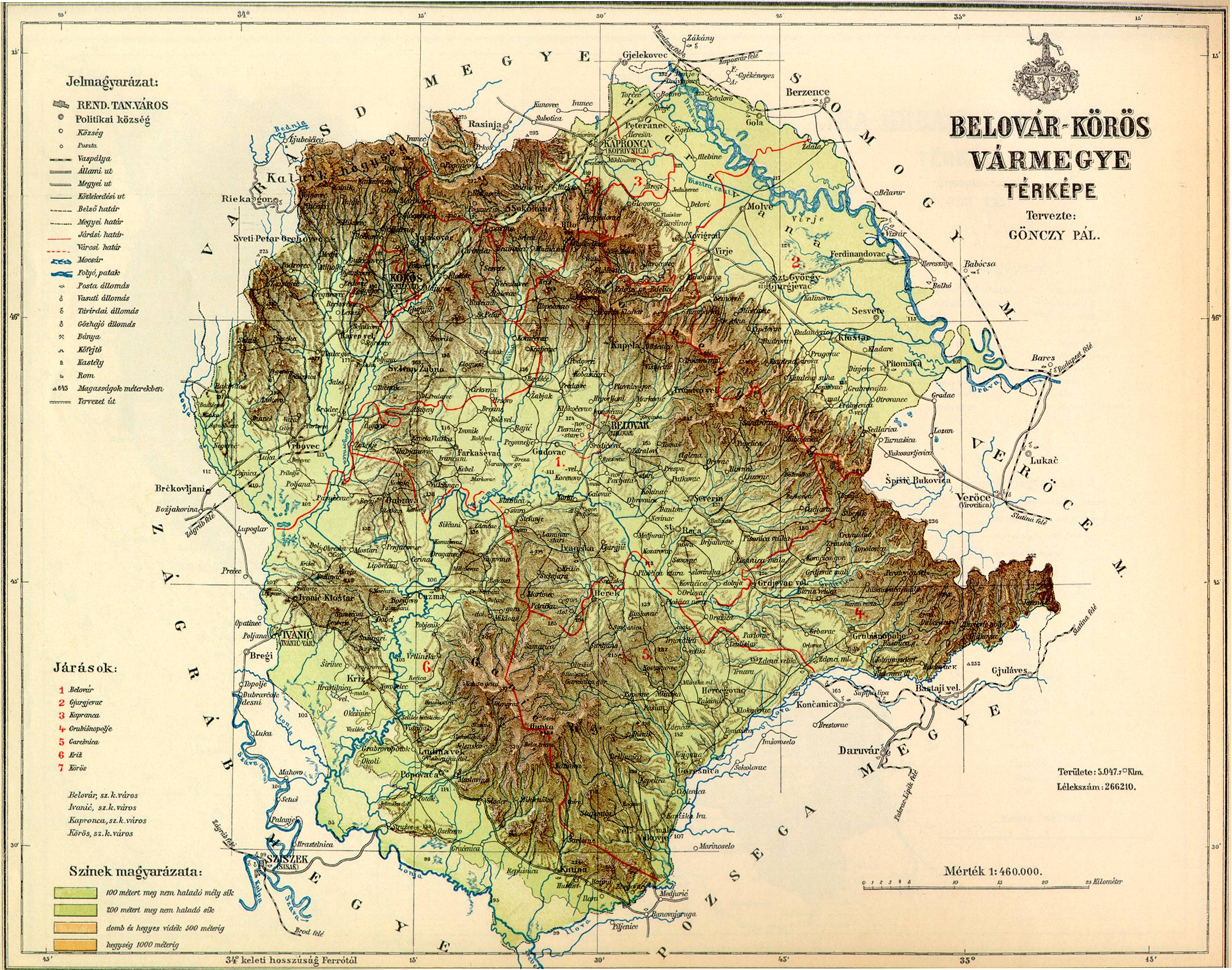
Map of the former Bjelovar-Križevci county

=== 19th century ===
The then-town of Bjelovar was pronounced a free royal town by ban Ivan Mažuranić in 1874, after the conclusion of the Ottoman invasion. Peaceful life and economic boom was interrupted by the beginning of the First World War. As an important military town, Bjelovar made its contribution by recruiting the male population, converting many public buildings into hospitals, and using the railway to transport soldiers and the wounded. With the war dragging on, the shortage of manpower and natural resources led to a difficult economic situation and a general shortage of food. At the end of the war, Bjelovar became part of the Kingdom of Serbs, Croats and Slovenes, and it retained its status as the administrative centre of the Bjelovar-Križevci County. On the basis of The Vidovdan Constitution of 1921 and the Law on Regional and County Self-Government (1922), the Kingdom of SHS was divided into 33 oblasts, and Bjelovar thereby lost the status of county center and became part of the Osijek Oblast, with the status of a district and a city.

Thanks to the economic foundations created in the previous period, based on trade, crafts and industry, the positive economic trend continued until The Great Depression, when the growth of registered merchants, craftsmen, and industrialists was still recorded, but with much lower incomes. In the interwar period, the city received some new facilities. The football field of the Bjelovar Academic Sports Club was arranged in the modern-day city quarter of Logorište. Public city pools were also established.

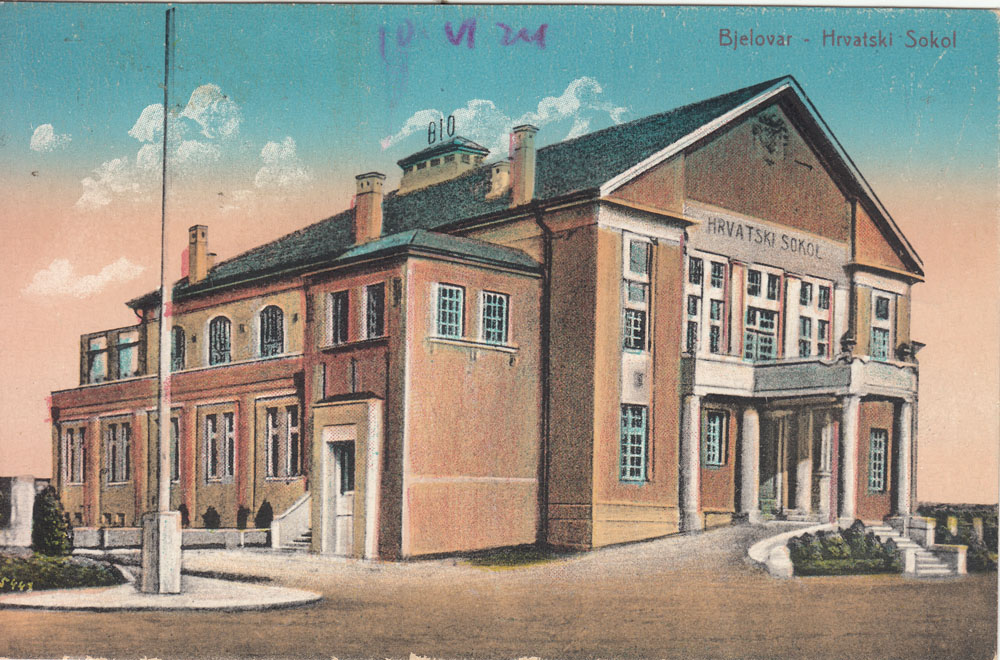
Croatian "Sokol" building in Bjelovar, from the year 1924

=== 20th century ===
==== Second World War ====
Bjelovar had historical role in the proclamation of the Independent State of Croatia at the beginnings of the Second World War. Two days before the official proclamation in Zagreb, on 8 April 1941, from the balcony of the then city hall (now the Bjelovar City Museum), mayor Julije Makanec proclaimed the Independent State of Croatia during the event known as the Bjelovar uprising. Within two months, a new territorial-administrative division of the state into 22 parishes followed. During the war, unlike the villages in the immediate vicinity of Bjelovar, the town did not experience severe material destruction. On several occasions, the railway, as well as the military bases in the quarter of Vojnović, were bombed by Allied forces.

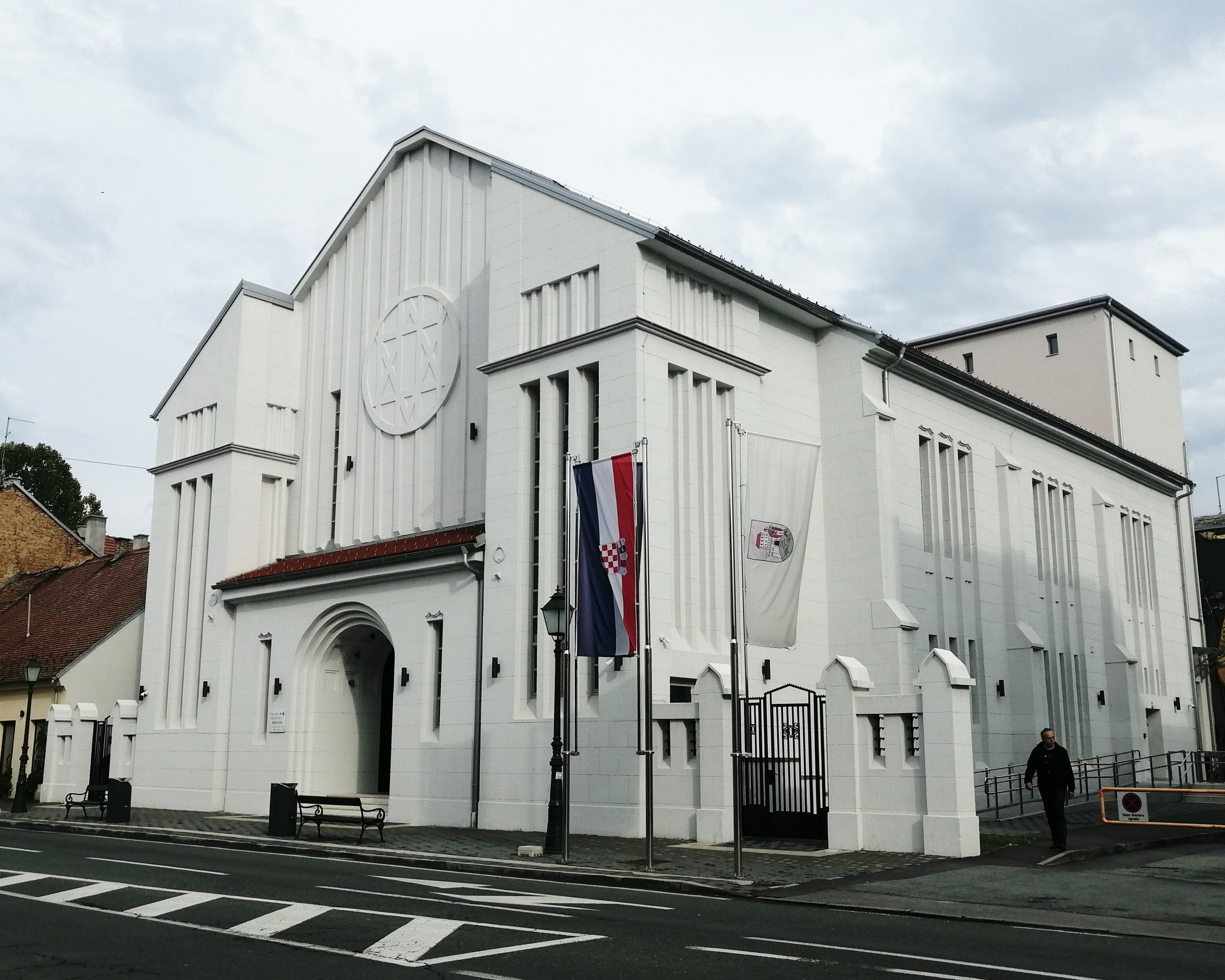
Bjelovar "Home of Culture" previously a synagogue prior to the events of the Second World War

==== Socialist period ====
With the end of the war, Bjelovar became part of the Socialist Yugoslavia, with tendencies towards the modernization and further industrialization of the city. Housing construction intensified, mainly in the northern part of the city, as well as to the south. In 1960, a new post office was built on the site of the old post office building. In 1955, the Koestlin plant moved from the city core to the industrial zone south of the railway. In addition to Koestlin and the already existing factories of Tomo Vinković (tractors), Česma (wood industry), Tehnogradnja (construction) and Elektrometal, new plants were built in the area from the 1960s, while the United Paromlin (later renamed 5 .maj), stayed in its historical location by the old mill, where it was reorganized and built upon.

In addition to demographic and economic growth, the aforementioned built infrastructure contributed to the strengthening of all functions, which turned Bjelovar into one of the most important centres of northwestern Croatia. One such industry, Drvna industrija Česma ('Česma Wood Industry'), became the namesake of the volunteer fire department DVD "Česma", founded on 23 April 1960. Another such industry, Sirela, became the namesake of the DVD "Sirela", founded on 5 October 1968.

==== Homeland War and aftermath ====
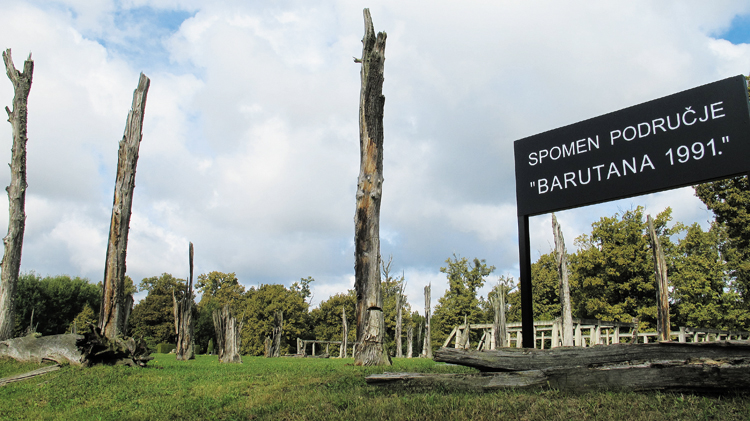
Remnants of the former Barutana depot, now the Barutana memorial area

After the first multi-party democratic elections in the SR Croatia, held on 22 and 23 April 1990, the newly founded Croatian Democratic Union won in Bjelovar. After the referendum and the declaration of independence, the crisis worsened and conflicts began. For this reason, on 12 September, the President of the Republic of Croatia, Dr. Franjo Tuđman, made a decision to block all JNA barracks in Croatia and suspend the supply of electricity, water, and food to these barracks. After a series of unsuccessful attempts to get the JNA army to peacefully leave the barracks located in the city or in its immediate surroundings, namely the barracks or military facilities in the quarters of Logorište, Vojnović, Zvijerci, the forest of Bedenik (The Barutana depot) and the Preradović barracks on the main city square, known as the Božidar Adžija Barracks.

On the morning of 29 September, ZNG (Zbor narodne garde) and the Croatian police attacked the JNA facilities in Bjelovar. In response, Kovačević contacted the JNA 5th Military District in Zagreb and requested airstrikes against the city and the ZNG. The sources do not indicate if the requested airstrikes were carried out. The 5th Military District instead pressured the central Croatian authorities to order the ZNG in Bjelovar to observe a comprehensive ceasefire, previously agreed between Croatia and the JNA on 22 September. To verify the ceasefire, the European Community Monitor Mission (ECMM) deployed a monitoring team to the city. However, the authorities in Bjelovar ignored the order they received from the General Staff and stopped the ECMM team before it reached the city. According to Šimić, the move was made after Lieutenant General Petar Stipetić telephoned him and urged him to continue the attack. The authenticity of Šimić's account of has been disputed by Admiral Davor Domazet-Lošo, who claims it was an attempt to discredit Croatia before the ECMM. At 19:00, the ZNG captured Božidar Adžija Barracks. By that time, all other JNA facilities in and near Bjelovar had been captured.

Before Barutana Depot was captured by the ZNG, one of the four storage structures, containing 1,700 tonnes (1,700 long tons; 1,900 short tons) of ammunition and explosives, was blown up by JNA Major Milan Tepić. The explosion occurred at 10:43, killing Tepić and eleven ZNG troops who were blockading the depot in Bedenik Forest. The blast knocked down trees in a circle 200 metres (660 feet) wide, caused damage to nearby structures, predominantly in the suburb of Hrgovljani, and could be heard 20 kilometres (12 miles) away. The JNA lost another soldier, Stojadin Mirković, in the area of the depot, killed by an antitank missile while he was engaging the ZNG using an infantry fighting vehicle gun.

29 September 1991 became one of the most important dates in the modern history of Bjelovar. In 1997, the City Councilor declared that date the Day of the City of Bjelovar. Since 2007, 29 September has been marked as Bjelovar Veterans' Day.

First Terezijana city festival was held in 1996, and has been held regularly ever since.

=== 21st century ===
In 2009, the then-Bjelovar parish church was officially pronounced as the Cathedral of Teresa of Ávila by Pope Benedict XVI, making it the youngest cathedral in Croatia. On the same day, the Roman Catholic Diocese of Bjelovar-Križevci, of which the Bjelovar Cathedral is the centre, was created.

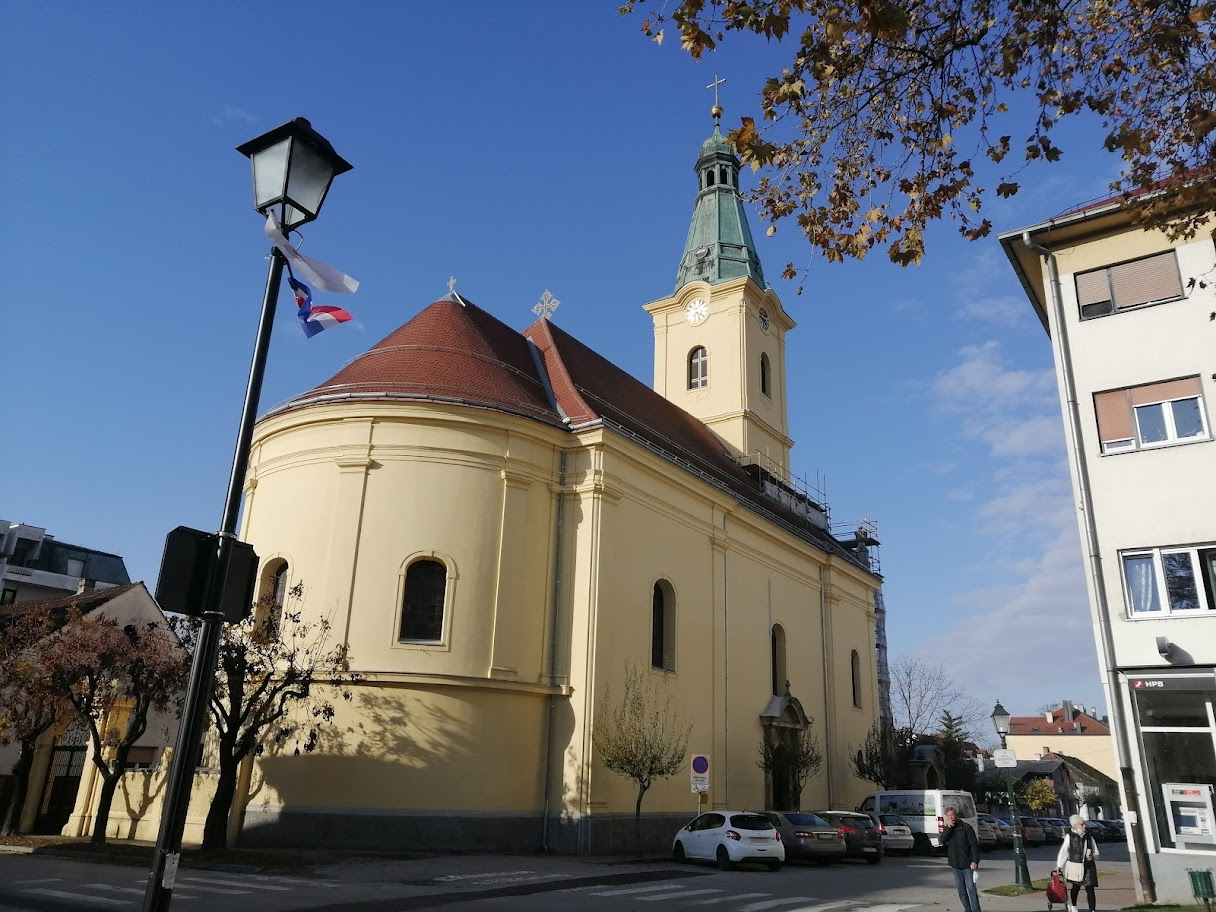
Orthodox church of The Holy Trinity

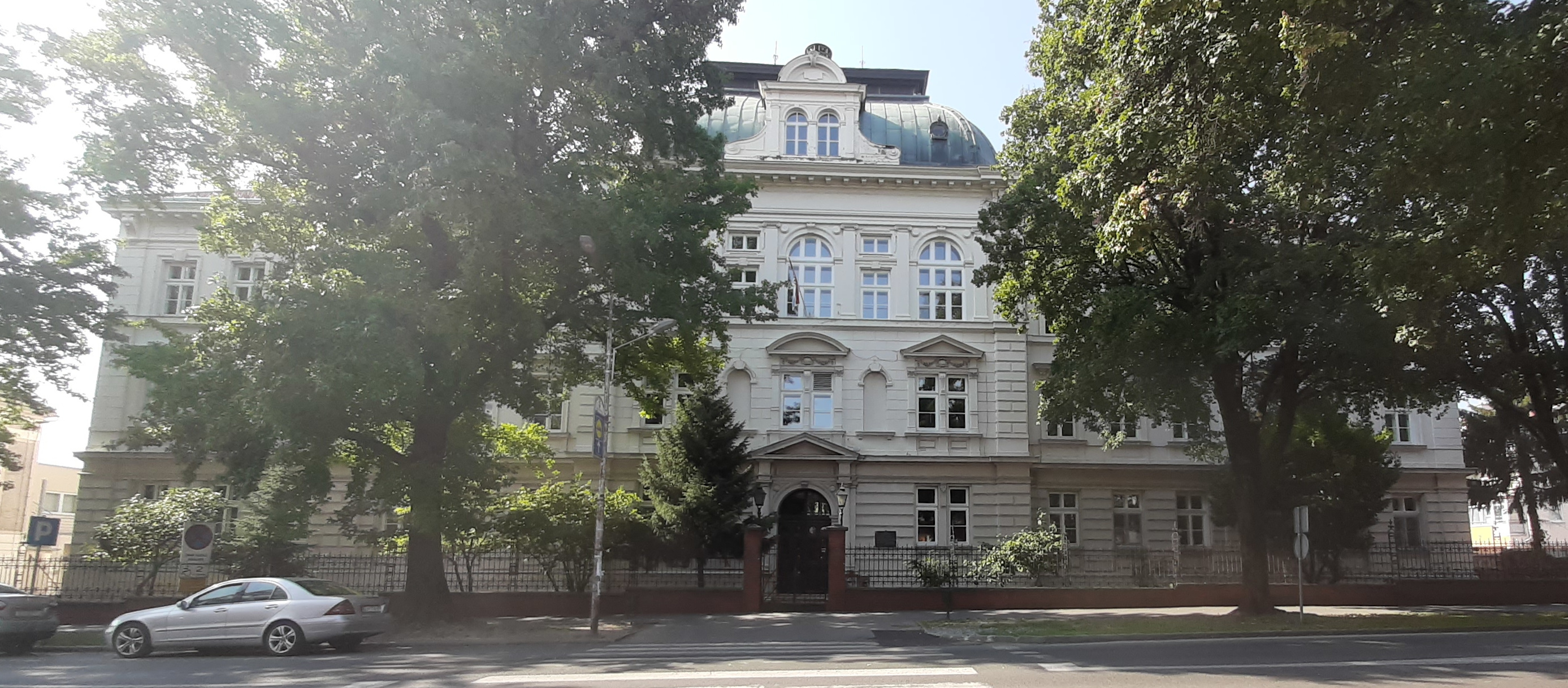
The Bjelovar Gymnasium

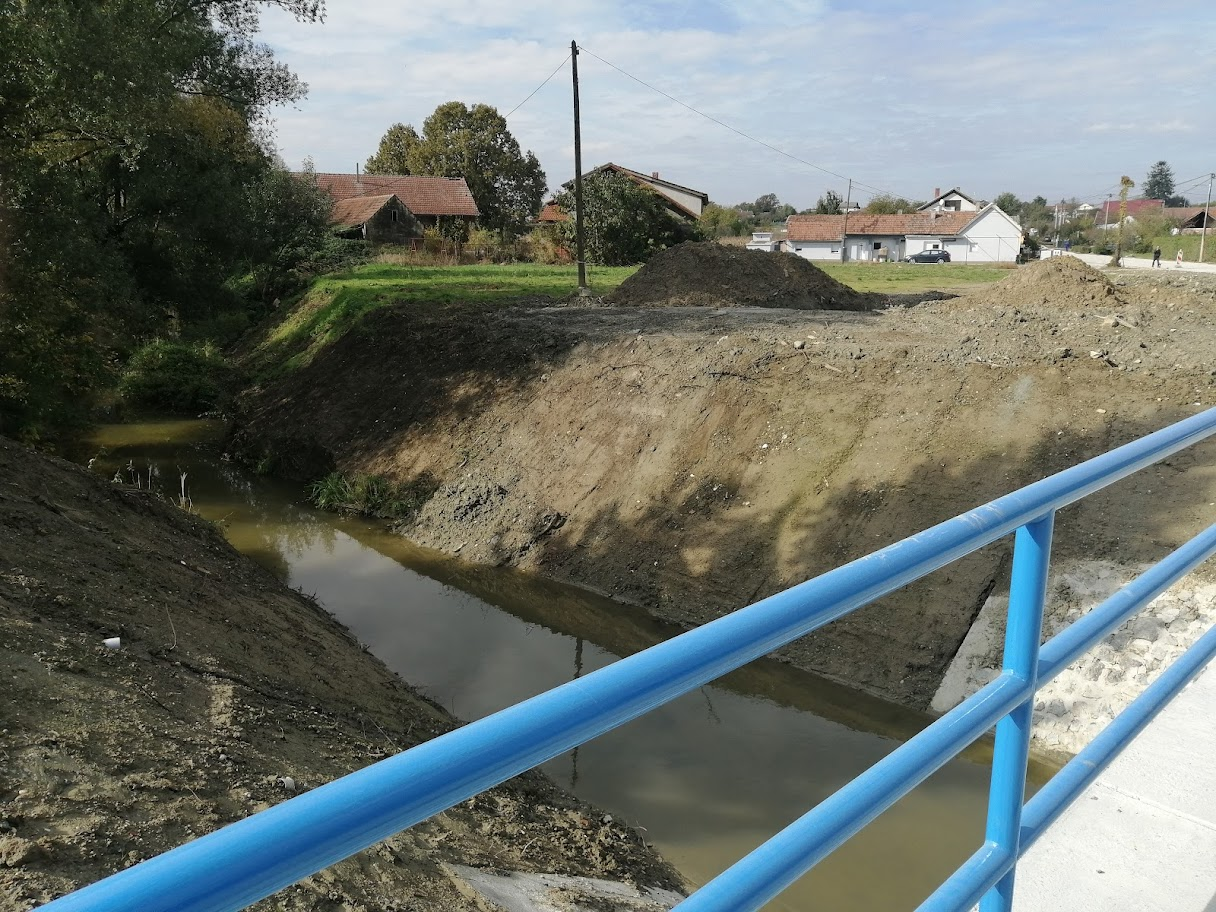
The Bjelovacka, right under the Lug bridge in the outskirts of Bjelovar

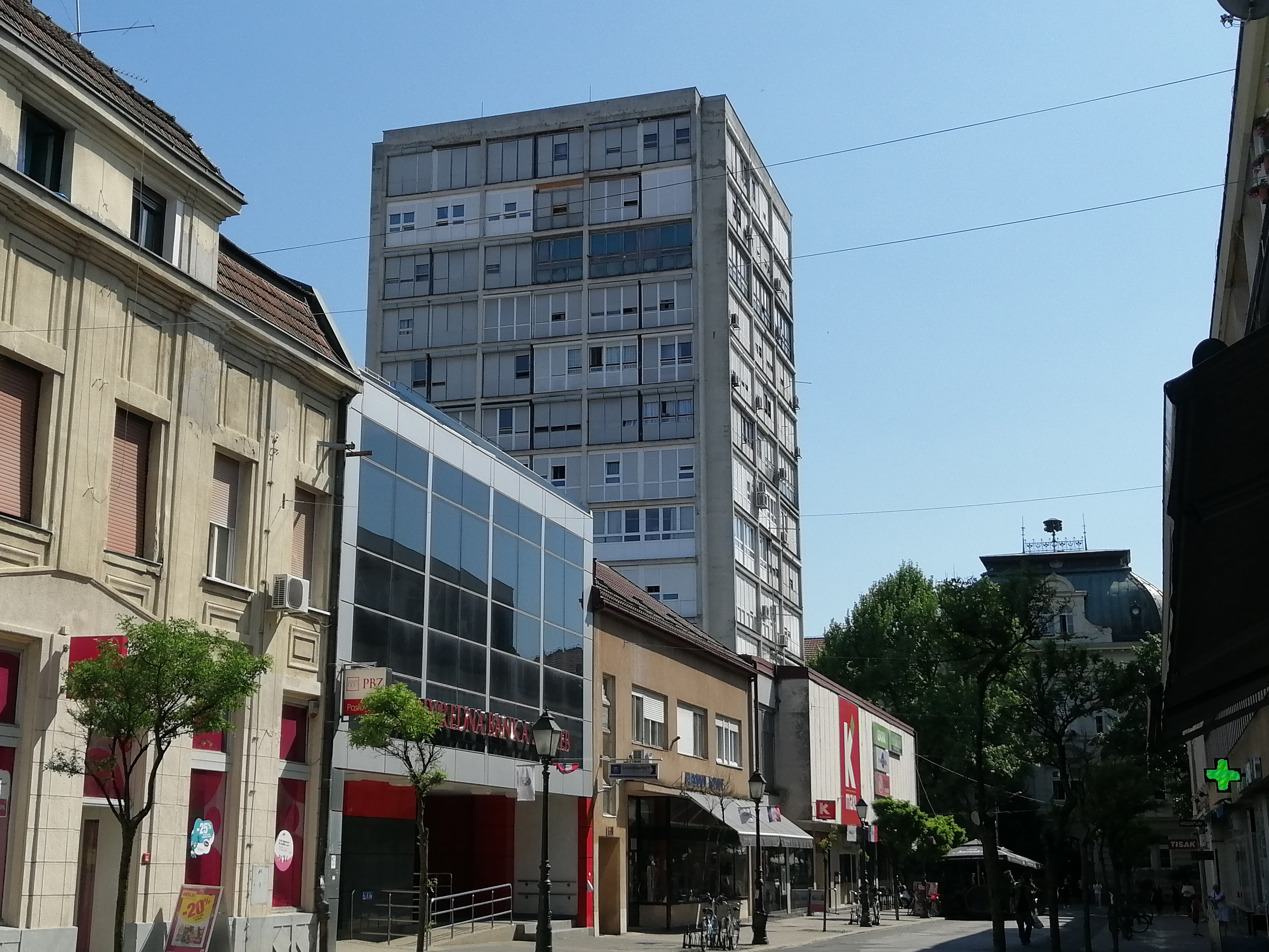
The Bjelovar skyscraper

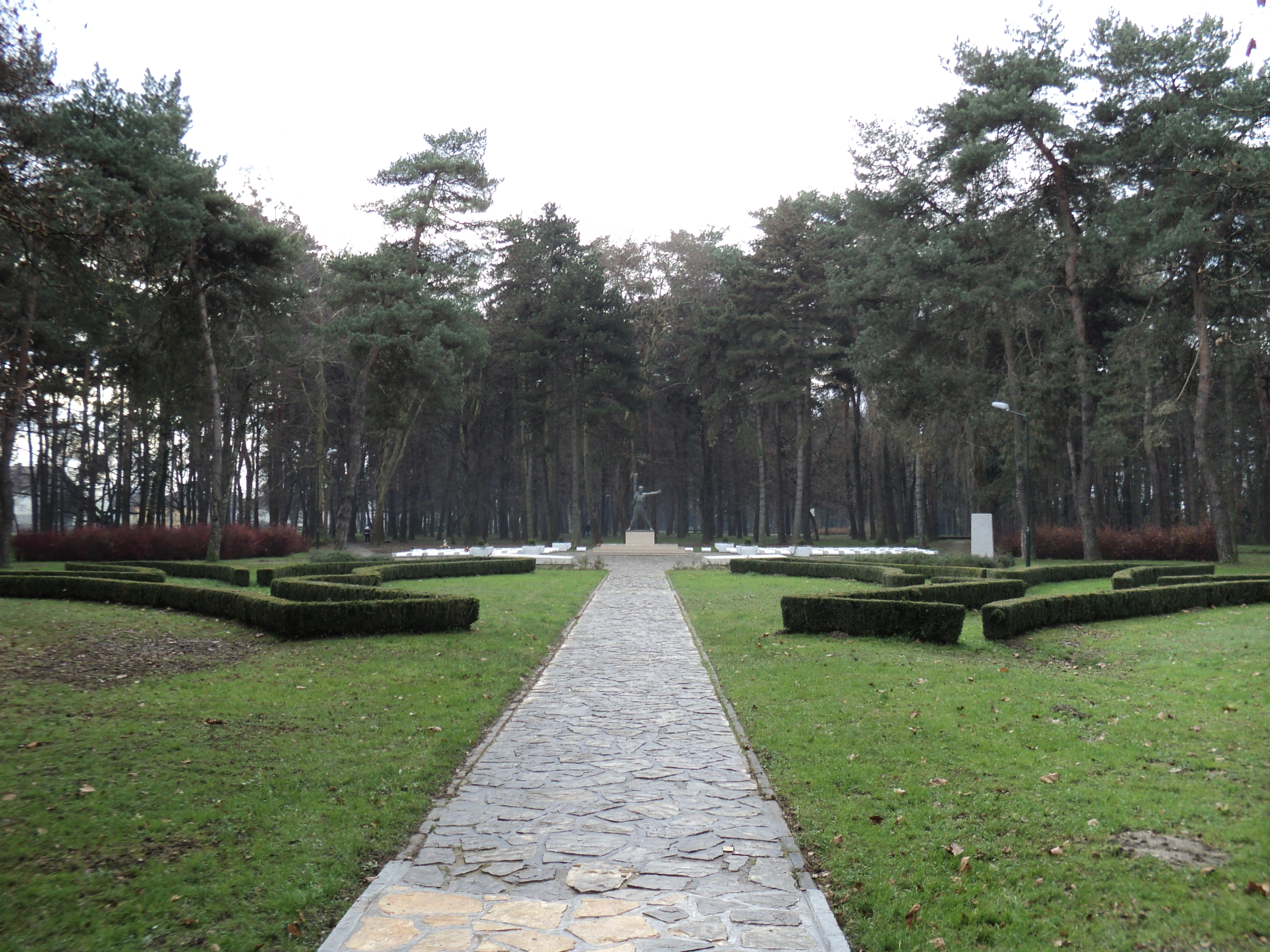
The Borik memorial area, for the victims of the Second World War in Bjelovar

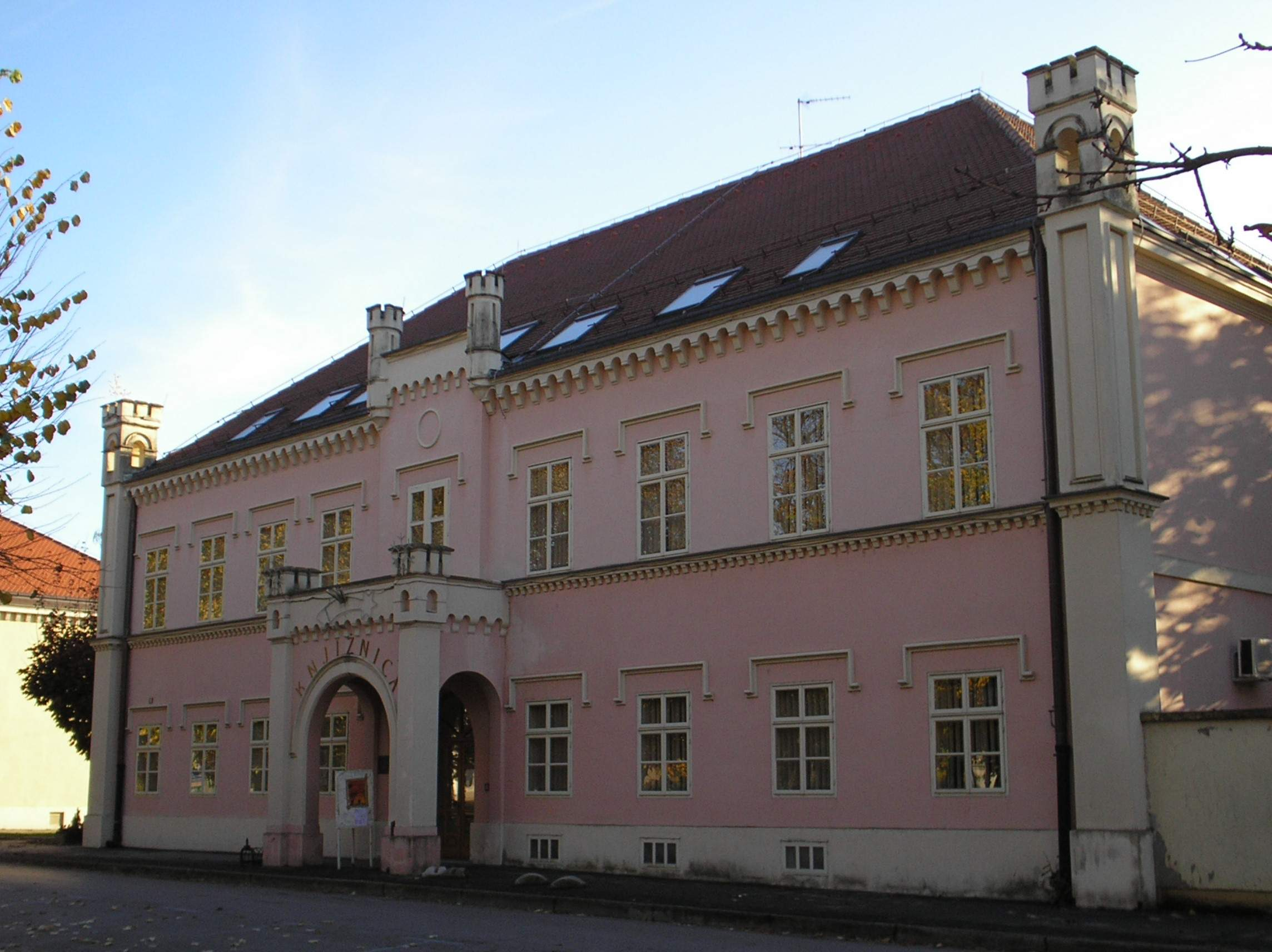
The Bjelovar city library

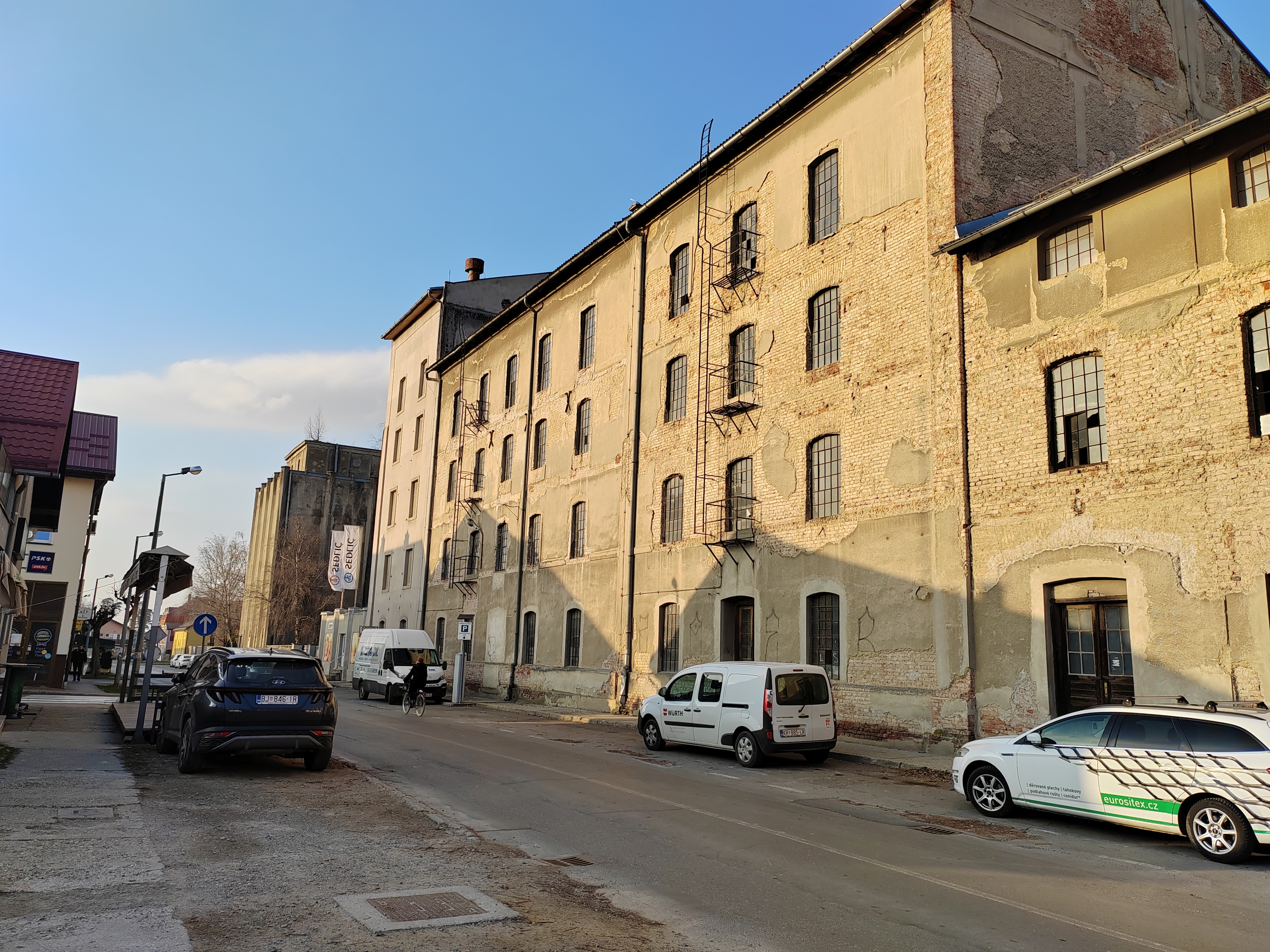
The old steam mill

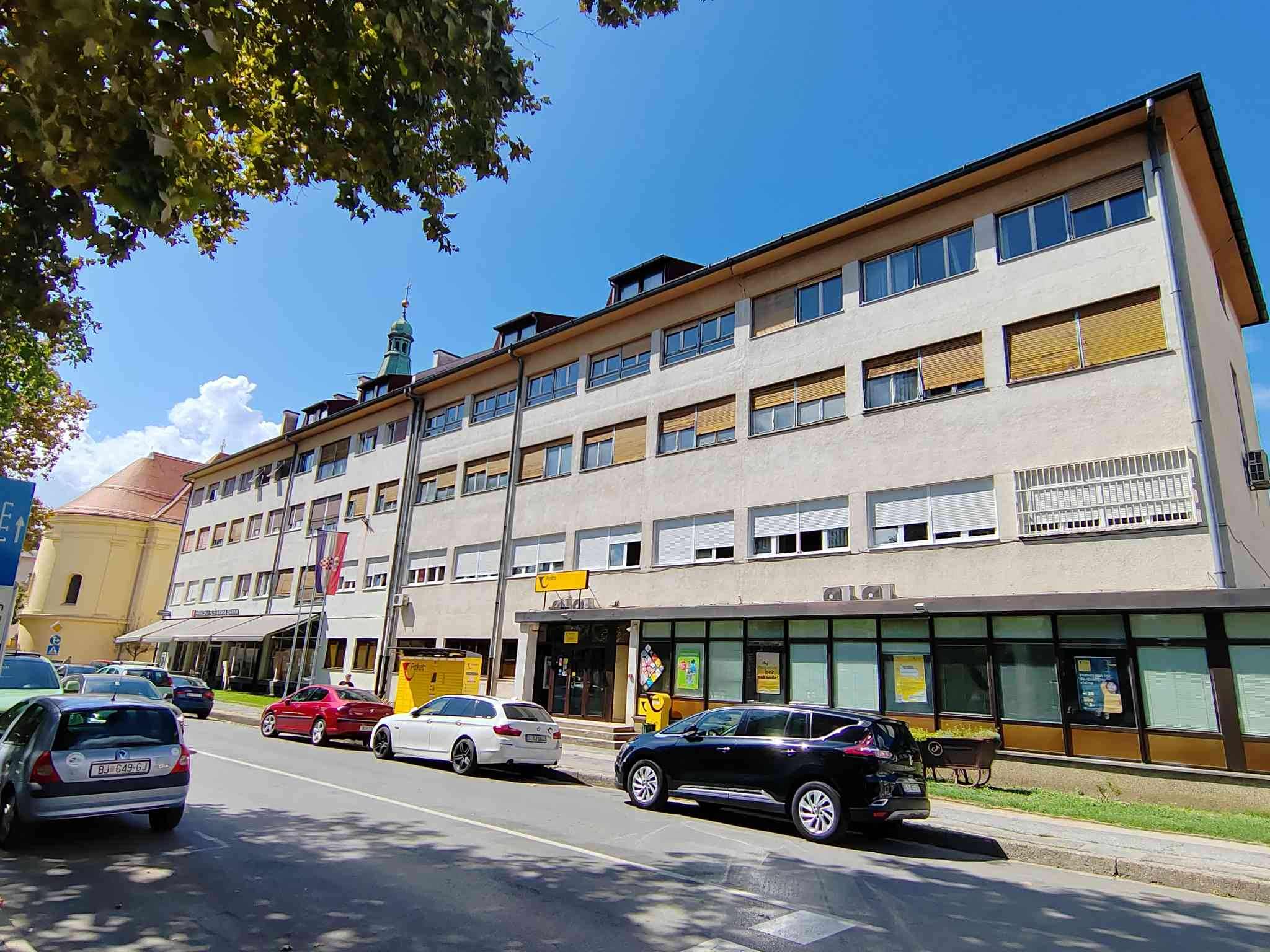
Bjelovar post office building

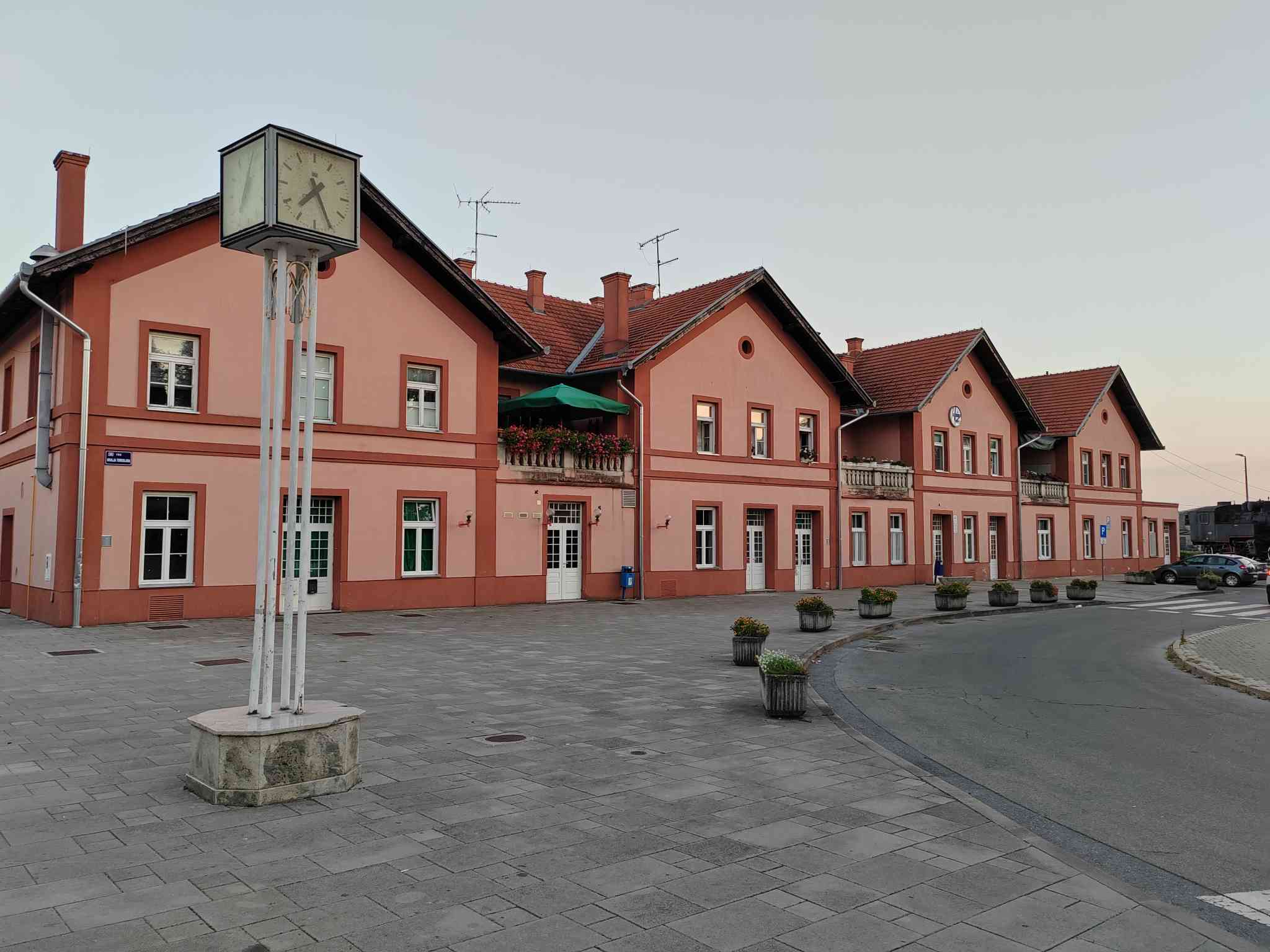
The Bjelovar train station

== Demographics ==
Historical population
Year	Pop.	±%
1857	10,128	—
1869	11,763	+16.1%
1880	12,942	+10.0%
1890	16,123	+24.6%
1900	19,652	+21.9%
1910	21,974	+11.8%
1921	22,990	+4.6%
1931	24,134	+5.0%
1948	26,981	+11.8%
1953	27,645	+2.5%
1961	29,907	+8.2%
1971	35,578	+19.0%
1981	39,893	+12.1%
1991	42,066	+5.4%
2001	41,869	−0.5%
2011	40,276	−3.8%
2021	36,316	−9.8%
Source: Naselja i stanovništvo Republike Hrvatske 1857–2021, DZS

Population by settlement:

- Bjelovar, population 27,024
- Breza, population 102
- Brezovac, population 1,080
- Ciglena, population 340
- Galovac, population 457
- Gornje Plavnice, population 687
- Gornji Tomaš, population 94
- Gudovac, population 1,095
- Klokočevac, population 828
- Kokinac, population 197
- Kupinovac, population 144
- Letičani, population 349
- Mala Ciglena, population 17
- Malo Korenovo, population 196
- Novi Pavljani, population 150
- Novoseljani, population 708
- Obrovnica, population 185
- Patkovac, population 257
- Prespa, population 511
- Prgomelje, population 696
- Prokljuvani, population 251
- Puričani, population 136
- Rajić, population 214
- Stančići, population 91
- Stare Plavnice, population 673
- Stari Pavljani, population 241
- Tomaš, population 241
- Trojstveni Markovac, population 1,301
- Veliko Korenovo, population 534
- Zvijerci, population 54
- Ždralovi, population 1,423

Population by ethnicity
year	total	Croats	Serbs	Yugoslavs	others
1991	66,039	53,113 (80.42%)	5,898 (8.93%)	2,631 (3.98%)	4,397 (6.65%)
1981	66,553	48,819 (73.35%)	5,897 (8.86%)	9,249 (13.89%)	2,588 (3.88%)
1971	65,824	52,580 (79.87%)	8,689 (13.20%)	1,726 (2.62%)	2,829 (4.29%)

City of Bjelovar: Population trends 1857–2021
v

population	10128	11763	12942	16123	19652	21974	22990	24134	26981	27645	29907	35578	39893	42066	41869	40276	36316
	1857	1869	1880	1890	1900	1910	1921	1931	1948	1953	1961	1971	1981	1991	2001	2011	2021

Sources: Croatian Bureau of Statistics publications

== Administrative division ==
The administrative sections of Bjelovar are the local administrative boards (mjesni odbori). There is a total of 38 of them, 32 of which correspond to surrounding settlements, while six are included within the city settlement:

- "Knez Domagoj"
- "Dr. A. Starčević"
- "A. G. Matoš"
- "K. Petar Krešimir"
- "Ban J. Jelačić"
- "Stjepan Radić"

== Politics ==
=== Minority councils and representatives ===
Directly elected minority councils and representatives are tasked with consulting tasks for the local or regional authorities in which they are advocating for minority rights and interests, integration into public life, and participation in the management of local affairs. At the 2023 Croatian national minorities councils and representatives elections, Roma (elected only 11 members) and the Serbs of Croatia each fulfilled legal requirements to each elect their own 15 member minority council of the City of Bjelovar, while Albanians and the Czechs of Croatia were electing individual representatives.

== Climate ==
Bjelovar has a temperate continental climate. Winters are moderately cold and summers are warm. Precipitation of about 900 mm (35 in) per year is normal. The prevailing wind during winter is northerly, with easterlies becoming stronger in spring, when it may be quite cold, often blowing for several days consecutively. In summer, the wind is southerly; it is warm and more humid. The mean yearly temperature in Bjelovar is about 12 °C (54 °F).

Since records began in 1949, the highest temperature recorded at the local weather station at an elevation of 141 metres (463 ft) was 38.5 °C (101.3 °F), on both 20 July 2007 and 24 August 2012. The coldest temperature was −26.7 °C (−16.1 °F), on 16 January 1963.

Climate data for Bjelovar (1949–2017)
Month	Jan	Feb	Mar	Apr	May	Jun	Jul	Aug	Sep	Oct	Nov	Dec	Year
Record high °C (°F)	19.0 (66.2)	21.3 (70.3)	27.4 (81.3)	30.3 (86.5)	34.1 (93.4)	36.7 (98.1)	38.5 (101.3)	38.5 (101.3)	33.7 (92.7)	28.2 (82.8)	25.4 (77.7)	22.5 (72.5)	38.5 (101.3)
Daily mean °C (°F)	−0.3 (31.5)	1.9 (35.4)	6.3 (43.3)	11.3 (52.3)	16.0 (60.8)	19.5 (67.1)	21.2 (70.2)	20.4 (68.7)	16.0 (60.8)	10.7 (51.3)	5.7 (42.3)	1.2 (34.2)	10.8 (51.5)
Record low °C (°F)	−26.7 (−16.1)	−24.9 (−12.8)	−20.5 (−4.9)	−6.8 (19.8)	−3.4 (25.9)	0.7 (33.3)	5.3 (41.5)	2.8 (37.0)	−2.0 (28.4)	−7.2 (19.0)	−16.4 (2.5)	−20.7 (−5.3)	−26.7 (−16.1)
Average precipitation mm (inches)	48.5 (1.91)	47.1 (1.85)	48.4 (1.91)	58.6 (2.31)	78.2 (3.08)	88.7 (3.49)	75.4 (2.97)	78.1 (3.07)	79.6 (3.13)	64.8 (2.55)	80.2 (3.16)	62.6 (2.46)	810.2 (31.89)
Average rainy days	7	7	9	12	13	12	11	9	10	10	11	9	120
Average snowy days	6	5	4	1	0	0	0	0	0	0	2	5	23
Mean monthly sunshine hours	59.8	89.8	147.6	183.2	233.7	248.8	274.8	259.5	188.0	135.8	70.9	46.5	1,938.4
Source: Croatian Meteorological and Hydrological Service

== Culture ==
Bjelovar contains three war memorials. The Barutana memorial area is dedicated to those who died defending the city on 29 September 1991, during the Croatian War of Independence. The Lug memorial area is dedicated to memorial to the Croatian victims of communism after the end of the Second World War in 1945, and the Borik memorial area is dedicated to Yugoslav Partisans and victims killed during the Second World War.

Terezijana is annual city festival established in memory of the Austrian Empress Maria Theresa, who founded Bjelovar in 1756. The first festival was held in 1996 and has been held every year since then in the center of Bjelovar on Eugen Kvaternik Square and other city streets; festival begins with the arrival of Maria Theresa's carriage and a special introductory program (imperial street parade). Festival includes concerts, street art performances, overflights, light shows, gastronomic events, city run and others, with participants from several European countries.

Bjelovar hosts the yearly "BOK" (Bjelovarski odjeci kazališta or 'Bjelovar Echoes of Theatre') theatre festival. It was founded and is run by Bjelovar actor Goran Navojec, and it hosts a selection of the best plays performed in Croatia during previous year.

The building of a former synagogue is now used as a cultural center, the Bjelovar Synagogue.

== Sport ==
In the 1970s, Bjelovar was known as the "handball capital of Europe", when its local squad RK Bjelovar (under the name "Partizan") dominated Croatian, Yugoslav, and European handball. The team came solely from Bjelovar and its environs.

NK Bjelovar is a local football club, founded in 1908.

The local chapter of the HPS is HPD "Bilogora", which had 98 members in 1936 under the Stanko Antolić presidency. Membership fell to 86 in 1937. Membership rose to 94 in 1938.

== International relations ==
=== Twin towns and sister cities ===
Bjelovar is twinned with:

- Imotski, Croatia
- Novalja, Croatia
- Pakrac, Croatia
- Rubiera, Italy
- Tomislavgrad, Bosnia and Herzegovina
- Visoko, Bosnia and Herzegovina

== People ==
For a complete list of people from Bjelovar and Bjelovar-Bilogora County see List of people from Bjelovar-Bilogora County.

- Đurđa Adlešič, Croatian politician
- Momčilo Bajagić, Serbian rock musician
- Bogdan Diklić, Serbian actor
- Krešimir Filić, historian and museologist
- Petar Gorša, Croatian sports shooter
- Gordan Jandroković, Croatian politician
- Sonja Kovač, Croatian actress, model and singer
- Zdravko Mamić, Croatian sportsman of Herzegovian origin
- Zoran Mamić, Croatian football manager
- Bojan Navojec, Croatian actor
- Goran Navojec, Croatian actor, founder of BOK Festival
- Mario Petreković, Croatian comedian and actor
- Božidar Puretić, Croatian physician
- Lavoslav Singer, Croatian industrialist
- Hrvoje Tkalčić, geophysicist
- Ognjen Vukojević, Croatian footballer
- Dragutin Wolf, Croatian industrialist
- Vojin Bakić, Croatian sculptor of Serbian origin
- Goran Tribuson, Croatian prose and screenplay writer
- Snježana Tribuson, Croatian screenwriter and film director
- Rada Šešić, Croatian critic, film maker, film director and lecturer, founder of DOKUart Festival
