= Zrinski Topolovac shooting =

1993 mass shooting in Croatia

1993 Zrinski Topolovac shooting
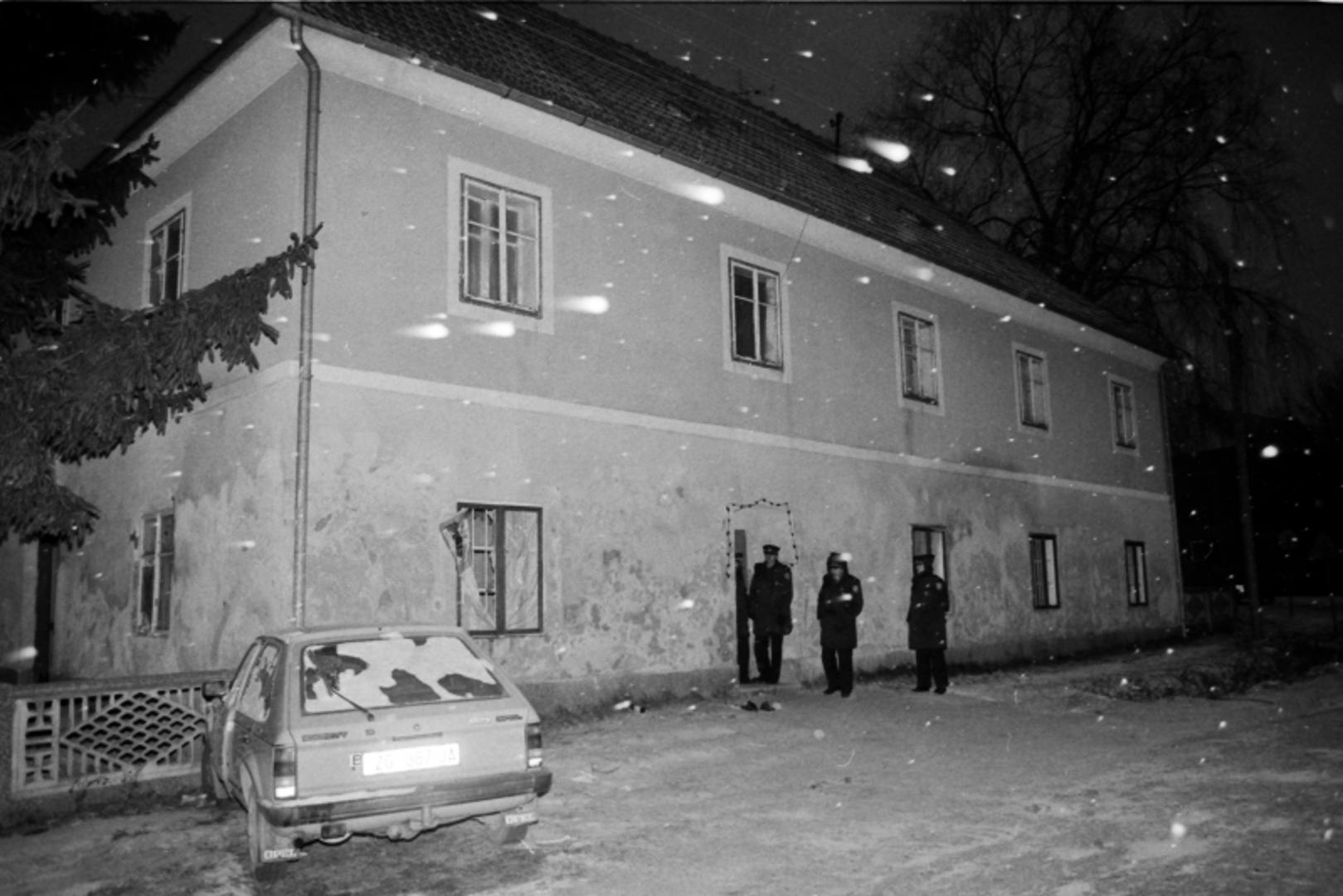
- Police at the scene of the shooting
- Location: 46.0231°N 16.7524°E; Zrinski Topolovac, Bjelovar-Bilogora County, Croatia
- Date: January 1, 1993; 33 years ago c. 0:30 - 2:00 (CET, UTC+01:00)
- Target: Attendees at the clergy house
- Attack type: Mass shooting; murder–suicide; Shootout; Fratricide; Spree shooting; Mass murder
- Weapon: 7.62x39mm Zastava M70 Assault Rifle
- Deaths: 10 (including the perpetrator)
- Injuries: 7
- Perpetrator: Vinko Palić
- Motive: Perceived social rejection; PTSD caused by the homeland war
- Litigation: Several wrongful death lawsuits by families of victims: Settled for 639,000 HRK (approx. €85,000) total. 15,600 HRK (approx. €2,000) awarded per family member due to unreasonable court delays; Government cleared of all liability, families denied 7 million Croatian kuna (approx. 1 million euro)

On January 1, 1993, a mass shooting occurred during a New Year's Eve party hosted at a clergy house in Zrinski Topolovac, Bjelovar-Bilogora County, Croatia. 28-year-old former soldier Vinko Palić shot and killed 9 people, including an on-duty police officer, and severely wounded 7 others with a Zastava M70, before being encircled by police and running to a nearby street, where he committed suicide.

It remains the deadliest single-perpetrator shooting in the history of Croatia. The shooting prompted the victims' families to file a what would become a 15-year-long wrongful death lawsuit against the government for negligence and missing key warning signs exhibited by the perpetrator, alongside other factors which lead to their failure to prevent the shooting.

== Events ==
=== Background ===
Zrinski Topolovac itself was no stranger to murderers, as it was known as the birthplace of Vinko Pintarić, a notorious serial killer who murdered 5 people over the course of 17 years before being shot in the head after police officers raided his house in Veliko Trgovišće.

On New Year's Eve, at around 9:30 PM CET, in 1992 at the Zrinski Topolovac clergy house, a New Year's Eve party took place on the ground floor of a vjeronaučna dvorana (religious education hall) at the local Catholic parish house. The party was organized by Marko Karača, the priest of the local parish. The room was small, rectangular, and only built for standard class sizes; that night, however, it was tightly packed with around 40 local youths. Tables and plastic chairs had been pushed up against the walls to clear the way for a makeshift dance floor in the middle of the room.

During the party, the gunman, Vinko Palić, and another man, Vinko Rodić, had a dispute over a 17-year-old female named Marija Ćibarić. During the altercation, several of Rodić’s friends stepped in to assist him. Later, Palić was noted to have been visibly frustrated at the group before leaving the party to go home. After arriving home, Palić changed into a military uniform, took out a Zastava M70 along with two high capacity magazines which were taped together, and drove back to the party.

=== Shooting ===
After arriving, Palić drove past the parish house and fired several shots from his car window directly into the air and toward the rectory courtyard. Palić then stopped and exited the vehicle, holding his Zastava M70. While several of the partygoers stepped outside of the parish building into the courtyard to see what was happening, Palić opened fire on them. Some of the partygoers rushed to help the wounded in the courtyard, while Palić moved to the other side of the yard.

Palić then fired directly through the window of the catechism hall, hitting several more people inside. This action also caused the music to stop and the lights to be cut. During this period of time, Palić entered the pitch-black religious education hall. While carrying his Zastava inside of his uniform, Palić encountered the youngest children present at the party, who were aged 12 to 15. He proceeded to chase them away.

Survivors reported that Palić specifically chose to target Vinko Rodić, his rival, and Marija Ćibarić, the woman who he had feuded over, as well as those who aided them in the dispute. It was also noted that despite Palić’s intoxication, his movements were highly deliberate and well-articulated.

At the courtyard, one of the gunman's brothers, Nikola, attempted to end the shooting by confronting Vinko in the parish courtyard while armed with a handgun. During the encounter, Vinko would fatally shoot Nikola at point-blank range.

Upstairs, Marko Karača and theology student Ivica Babić heard the screams of the attendees. Babić then ran downstairs to unlock the interior door that connected the religious education hall to the parish office. Once the door was opened, around 30 survivors flooded upstairs and scattered into rooms on the upper floor, hiding under tables and using a refrigerator to barricade the doors.

Palić followed the survivors upstairs and spotted Vlado Rodić, who was at the back of the fleeing group, fatally shooting him in the back.

Vinko’s other brother, Zlatko Palić, attempted to intervene and end Palić's attack by talking him down in a calm way. Vinko was visibly frustrated, aiming his weapon at Zlatko and telling him to "Run, or I'll kill you too."

Later, Ivica Babić descended the staircase into the smoke-filled hallway and came face- to-face with the gunman in the middle of the stairwell. Babić described Palić as pale, visibly drunk and holding two spare magazines in his hand while pointing his rifle. Babić asked him, "Vinko, surely you won't kill me too?" to which Palić replied, "Not you, you are a priest. Where is Marija?". When Babić stepped forward, Palić ordered, "Stop or I'll shoot!". After girls from the rooms above called out that Marija was not there, and Babić assured him he could be trusted, Palić backed down the stairs and exited the building. After this interaction, priest Marko Karača managed to call the police.

A police car from Bjelovar arrived at the parish house after receiving a distress call. Palić hid in a bush, carefully observing before he ambushed the patrol car. He fatally shot 52 year-old police officer Blaž Majdandzić and seriously injured Darko Mikačević, another police officer. Božidar Cibarić, who was the only unharmed police officer on patrol, managed to move Darko and another wounded victim, Nikola, into an Opel Kadett car to escape while Palic opened fire, tearing the car seats around them while Božidar called for backup.

Following the attack on the police, survivors reported that there were no shots fired for around half an hour. During this pause in the attack, several survivors took the opportunity to escape from the parish house.

After the silence ended, Palić walked over to the nearby home of Marija Ćibarić's parents and instructed them, "Go see what I did to your children." He then quickly ran back and set up an ambush in front of the parish house. As Marija, her father Franjo, her mother Geta, and her grandmother Veronika ran out of their house toward the rectory, Palić opened fire. Marija was shot and instantly killed in front of the building while her father, mother, and grandmother survived with severe injuries.

At 2:30 AM, when the heavily armed Lučko Special Police Anti-Terrorist Unit arrived and surrounded the gunman, Palić hesitated before running off to a nearby street. He laid down on the road, held the gun against his temple, and fatally shot himself, ending the shooting. The shooting lasted 2 hours, during which Palić fired a total of 103 bullets.

== Perpetrator ==
Vinko Palić (January 20, 1965 — January 1, 1993) was born in Zrinski Topolovac to six brothers, and was a soldier of the 105th Bjelovar Brigade in the Croatian Army from 1991 until 1992 during the homeland war. Palić served as a machine gunner, being concentrated in Eastern Slavonia and Posavina. He had returned from the frontline two weeks before the shooting took place. Palić suffered from severe post-traumatic stress disorder after returning, which the government had been aware of before the shooting took place. A soldier who was close to the shooter later stated that Palić once threatened to murder up to 5 or 6 people in his village. The soldier reported it to a military officer, but Palić was never discharged or prosecuted for his threat.

In 1983, when Palić was 19, he was checked by a military doctor and deemed psychologically unfit for the military. Four months before the shooting took place, another medical check-up was performed on Palić by a military doctor. The doctor wrote that Palić needed to be sent to a psychiatrist in order to more carefully examine him and determine whether Palić was competent enough to continue with his military duties, the evaluation determined that Palić had possessed personality traits similar to Asperger’s and Narcissism of a “rigid” type. The evaluation was ordered by Palić's general, Zvonko Peternel, because he had believed that Palić was psychologically ill and that Palić had reacted to the examination in an inappropriate way, During the evaluation Palić was noted to have had trouble with general empathy and eye contact with the doctor. Despite these warnings, Palić was never sent to a psychiatrist again, and no further medical examinations were performed on him.

When Palić was not on the frontline, he was known to regularly carry sometimes shoot from his automatic rifle in the village at random, being "really hard to calm down when he was drunk." He was also known for self-destructive behaviors, such as chewing on glass bottles when drunk, leading postmortem investigators to believe Palić may have had undiagnosed pica. Palić was known to be a heavy drinker, especially at social gatherings and events. Neighbors and others who knew Palić described how he was known to be kind, well mannered, and hard working when sober.

In an investigation conducted by the police at Palić’s house after his death, a stash of multiple unregistered weapons, along with high-capacity magazines and massive ammunition stashes were discovered on his property. Investigators stated that this was not concerning, as it wasn't uncommon for soldiers to take weapons home from the battlefield and keep them as trophies.

== Victims ==
Most of Palić's victims were clergy house attendees, with the only exception being an on-duty officer who died after being called on patrol to end or at least minimize the shooting. In total, Palić killed 9 people and seriously injured 7 others.

The wounded and deceased were transported to the medical center Emilija Holik in Bjelovar, which was located approximately 15 kilometers from the crime scene.

The list of deceased from the shooting is as follows:

- Marija Ćibarić (17) – The young woman at the center of the initial argument.
- Nikola Ćibarić (20) – Marija's older brother.
- Vlado Rodić (27) – The person who was targeted by Palić during the initial confrontation.
- Filip Rodić (20) – Vlado's younger brother.
- Sebastijan Gashi (26) – A guest at the party.
- Paško Gashi – Sebastijan's brother, who was also attending the celebration.
- Toni Gucić (19) – Another young guest present at the parish house.
- Nikola Palić (20) – The perpetrator's own brother, who was shot while trying to disarm Vinko and protect the others.
- Blaž Majdandžić (52) – The on-duty police officer who was fatally shot upon arriving at the scene to intervene.

== Aftermath ==
Due to the ongoing Croatian War of Independence, so as to not impact morale, little information regarding the shooting was published in the news. Then-president of Croatia Franjo Tuđman declared a national day of mourning, but did not announce any new gun regulations following the incident.

More details about the investigation were only made public during the impacted families' governmental lawsuit and after the war had ended.

=== Lawsuits ===
In 1995, 42 family members of the victims initiated a civil lawsuit against the Government of Croatia and the Ministry of Defence, seeking approximately 7 million HRK in damages for state negligence involving the failure to prevent the shooting, which was perpetrated by a traumatized soldier with access to military weaponry. The family also sought an alimony of about 2,000 euros a month. They claimed that the government needed to make up for the lost income their children would've generated had they not died.

The legal proceedings were prolonged by a state-mandated legislative freeze between 2000 and 2003, which culminated in a 2005 Constitutional Court ruling that penalized the state 639,600 Croatian kuna for unreasonable judicial delays.

In 2009, the Zagreb Municipal Civil Court cleared the state of all liability in the shooting, ruling that because the perpetrator was off-duty and utilizing an unregistered rifle, the court believed that Palić was acting as a civilian.

Judge Nikola Raguz concluded that there was no evidence Palić was mentally ill, refused the request of the injured to expertly determine whether Palić was mentally ill due to a lack of medical documentation on the basis of which the examination would be carried out, and did not refer to the letter of Palić's former general, who pointed out that Palić had been exposed to enemy tanks, artillery, and aircraft since August of 1992 while serving as a machinegunner, and that the war had taken a toll on his mental health. The judge claimed that the general had said this without evidence.

By the end of the court hearing, at least 3 of the 41 plaintiffs had died. Following the rejection of all subsequent appeals by the Supreme Court, the plaintiffs were legally ordered to cover the state's accumulated court costs, which totaled approximately 1 million HRK.

== See also ==
- Podvinje cafe shooting
- 2024 Daruvar retirement home shooting
- 2020 Split Shooting
- Fratricide
- Post-traumatic stress disorder
- Croatian War of Independence
