= List of people from Bjelovar-Bilogora County =

The following is a list of notable people from Bjelovar and the geographical area corresponding to present-day Bjelovar-Bilogora County, Croatia.

== Artists, musicians and actors ==
- Momčilo Bajagić Bajaga (born 1960), singer, songwriter and musician.
- Vojin Bakić (1915–1992), sculptor.
- Boris Buzančić (1929–2014), actor and politician.
- Dragomir Čumić (1937–2013), actor.
- Tošo Dabac (1907–1970), photographer.
- Bogdan Diklić (born 1953), actor.
- Eva Fischer (1920–2015), actress.
- Sonja Kovač (born 1984), actress, model and singer.
- Charles Millot (1921–2003), actor.
- Edo Murtić (1921–2005), painter.
- Milena Mrazović (1863–1927), journalist, writer, piano, and composer.
- Bojan Navojec (born 1976), theatre and film actor.
- Goran Navojec (born 1970), actor and musician.
- Mario Petreković (born 1972), comedian, actor, television presenter and entertainer.
- Ivo Robić (1923–2000), singer.
- Nasta Rojc (1883–1964), painter.
- Ferdo Rusan (1810–1879), reformer, composer and musician.
- Ivo Serdar (1933–1985), actor.
- Zdenko Strižić (1902–1990), architect, urban planner, and teacher.
- Snježana Tribuson (born 1957), screenwriter and film director.
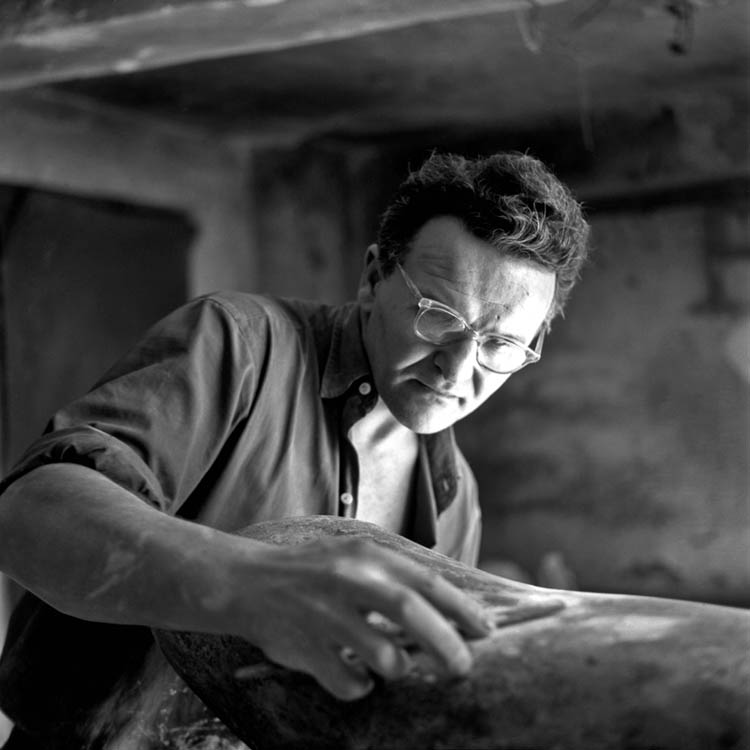
Bakić

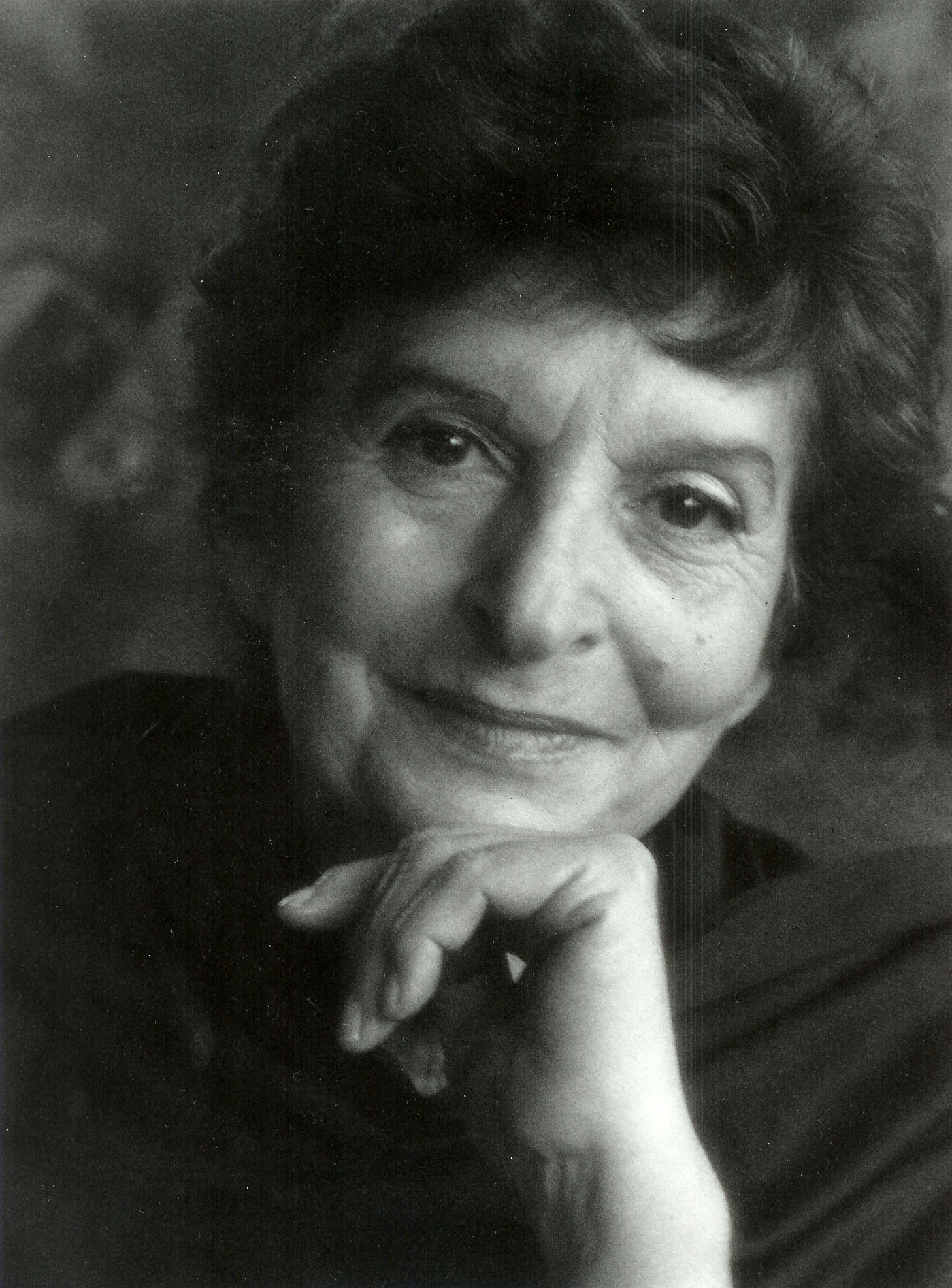
Fischer

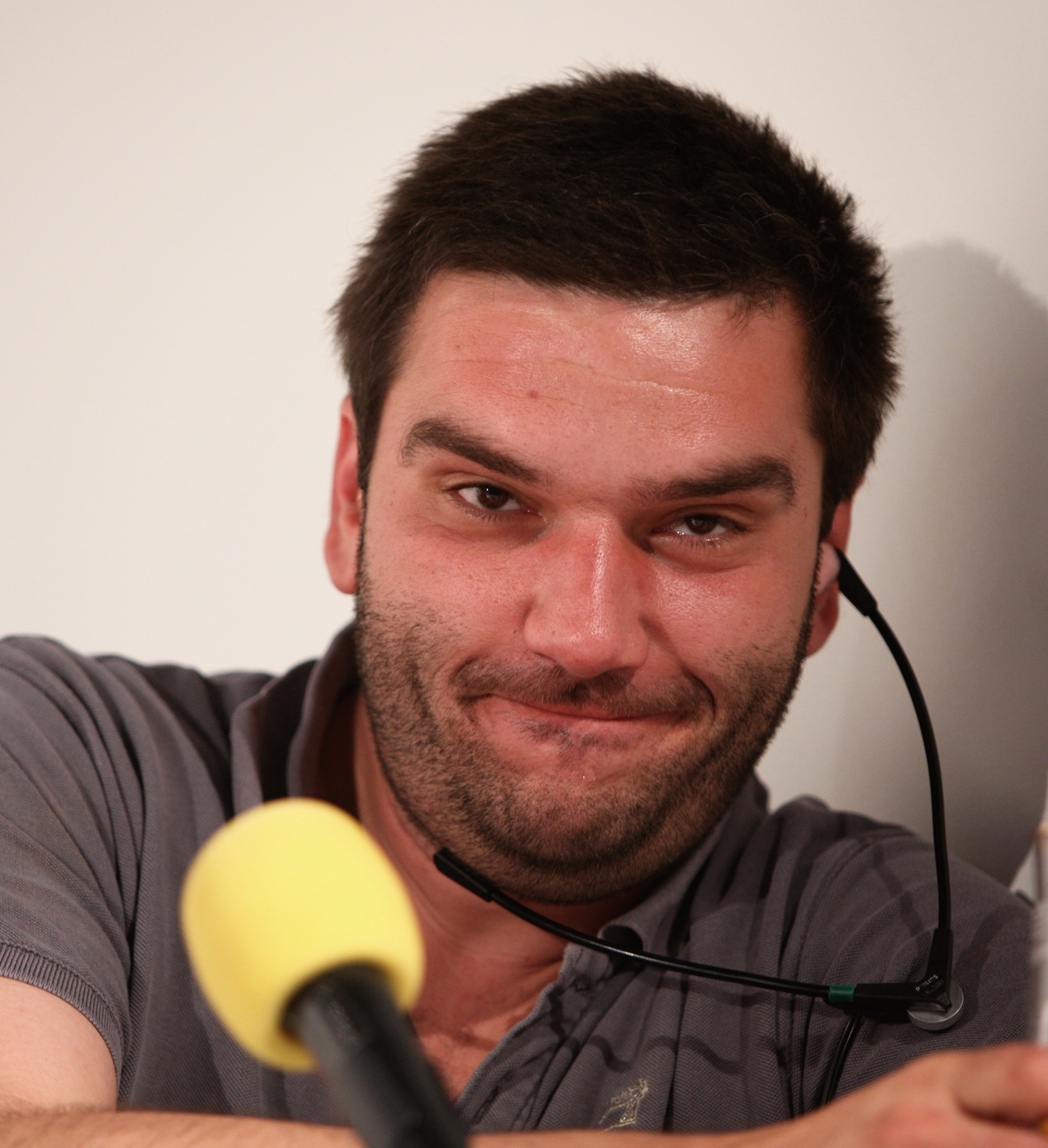
Navojec

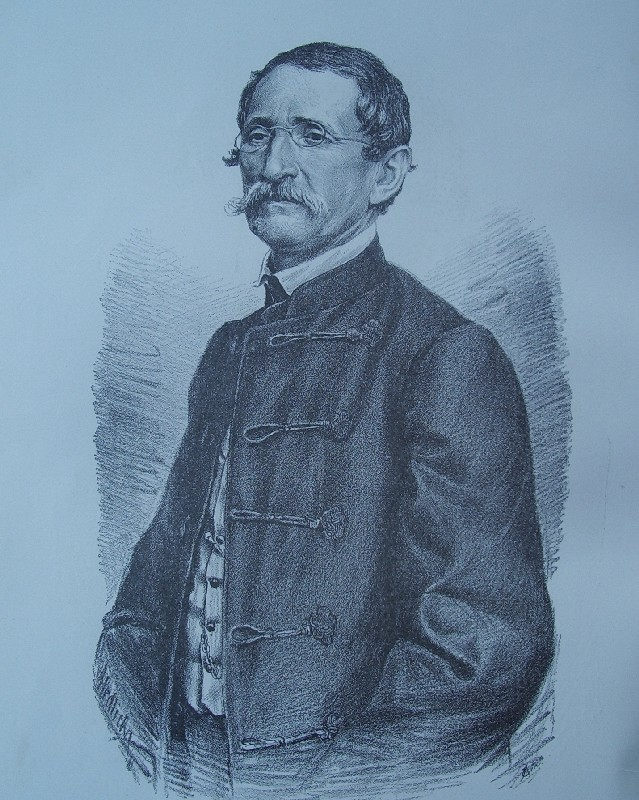
Rusan

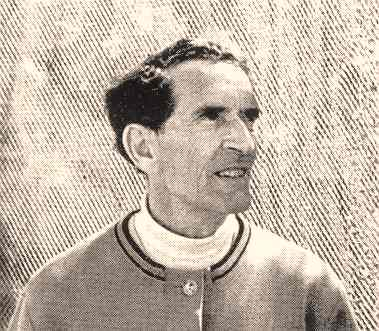
Strižić

== Authors ==
- Slavko Kolar (1891-1963), writer.
- Mato Lovrak (1899-1974), children's literature writer.
- Milena Mrazović (1863-1927), journalist, writer.
- Josip Novakovich (born 1956), writer.
- Đuro Sudeta (1903-1927), writer.
- Janus Pannonius (1434-1472) poet, diplomat and Bishop of Pécs.
- Goran Tribuson (born 1948), prose and screenplay writer.
- Ivan Trnski (1819-1910), writer, translator and 7th President of Matica hrvatska.
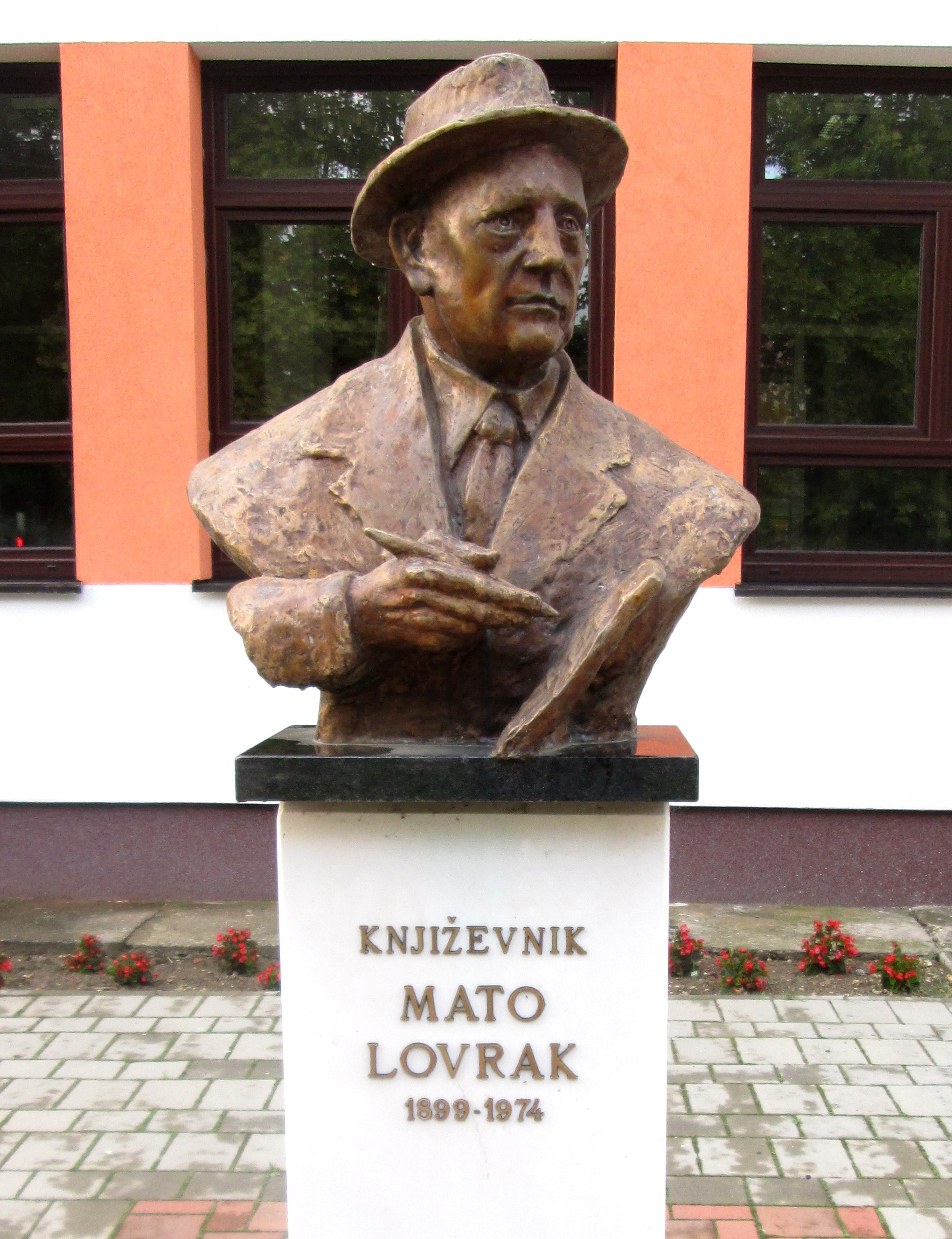
Lovrak

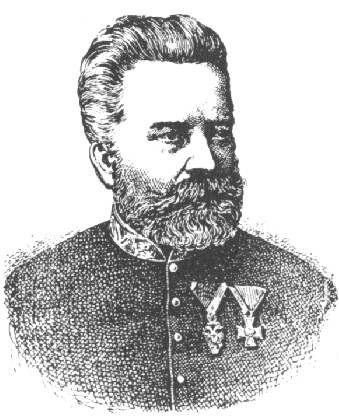
Trnski

== Military leaders ==
- Vilko Begić (1874-1947), military officer.
- Ivan Herenčić (1910-1978), leader in the Independent State of Croatia.
- Károly Knezić (1808-1849), honvéd general in the Hungarian Army.
- Branko Krga (born 1945), military officer and Serbia's Chief of the General Staff.
- Marko Mesić (1901-1982) decorated gunnery officer.
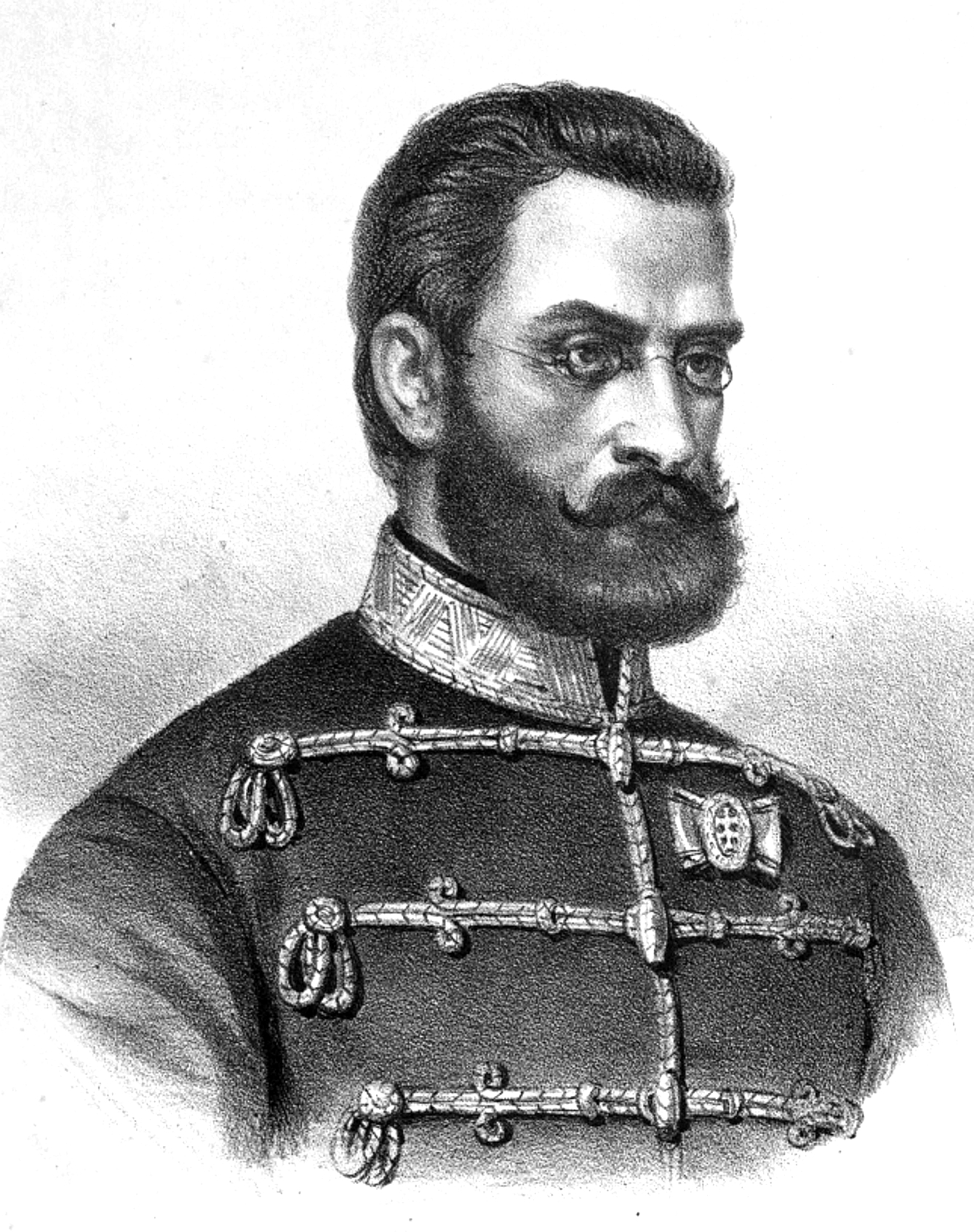
Knezić

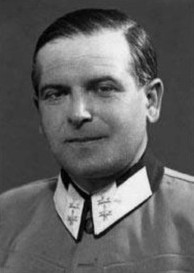
Mesić

== Politicians ==
- Đurđa Adlešič (born 1960), politician and former leader.
- Milivoj Ašner (1913-2011) Independent State of Croatia's police officer who was number 4 on the Simon Wiesenthal Center's list of most wanted Nazi war criminals and on the Interpol's most wanted list.
- Vesna Bedeković (born 1966), politician who served as the Minister of Demographics, Family, Youth and Social Policy of Croatia.
- Boris Buzančić (1929-2014), actor, politician, mayor of Zagreb.
- Slavko Cuvaj (1851-1931), politician, Ban of Kingdom of Croatia-Slavonia.
- Silvije Degen (born 1942), politician and lawyer.
- Gordan Jandroković (born 1967), politician and diplomat, 12th Speaker of the Croatian Parliament, Minister of Foreign and European Affairs.
- Julije Makanec (1904-1945), politician.
- Anka Mrak-Taritaš (born 1959), politician, Minister of Construction and Spatial Planning and President of the Civic Liberal Alliance.
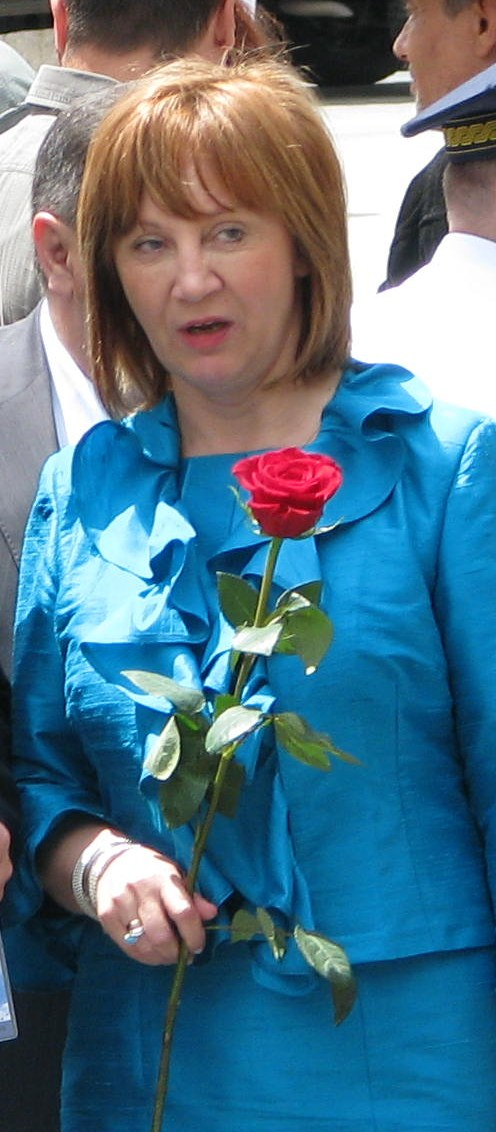
Adlešič

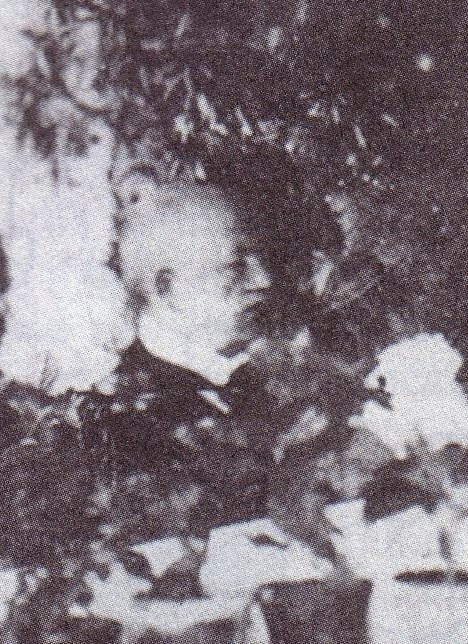
Cuvaj

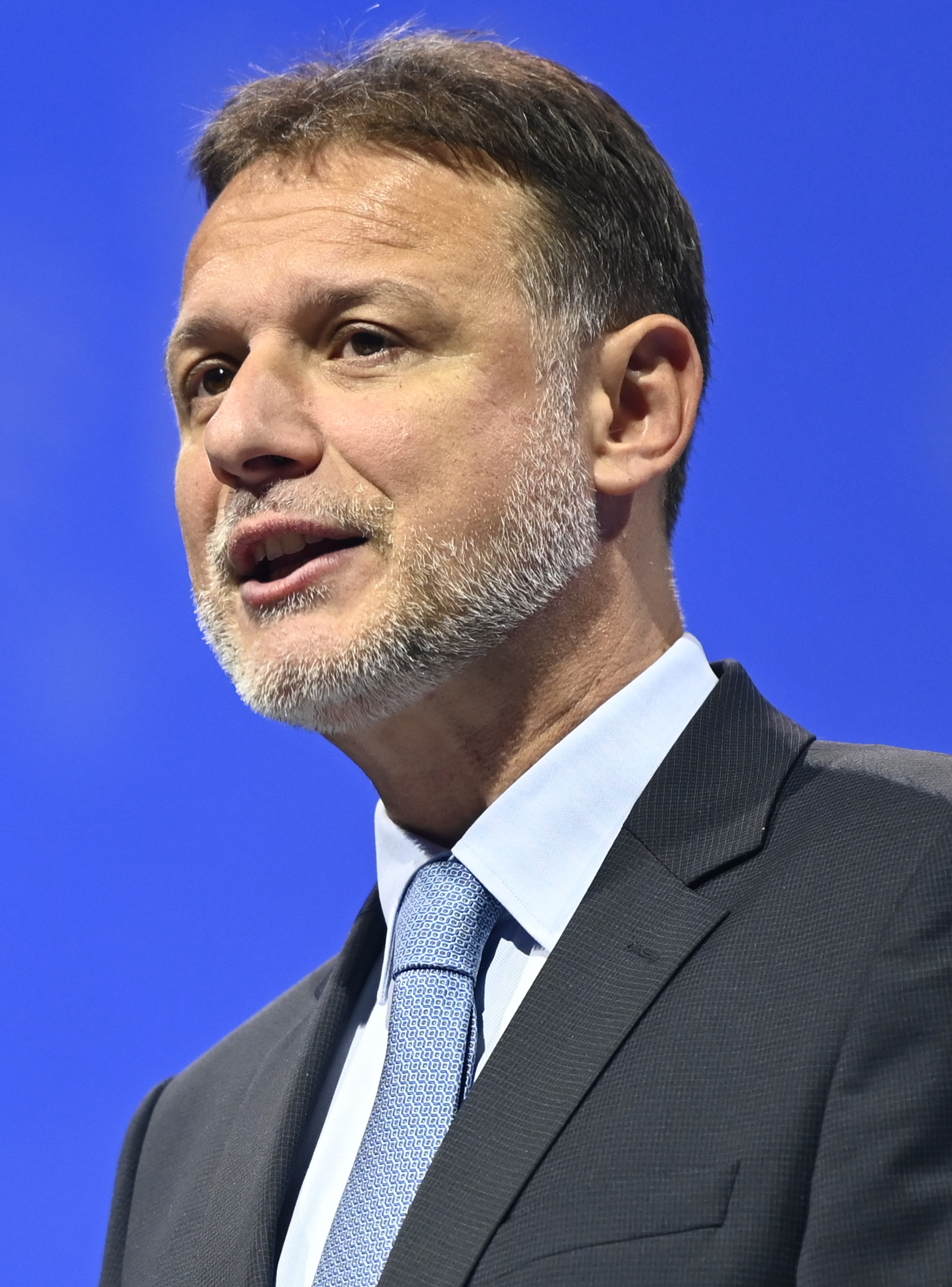
Jandroković

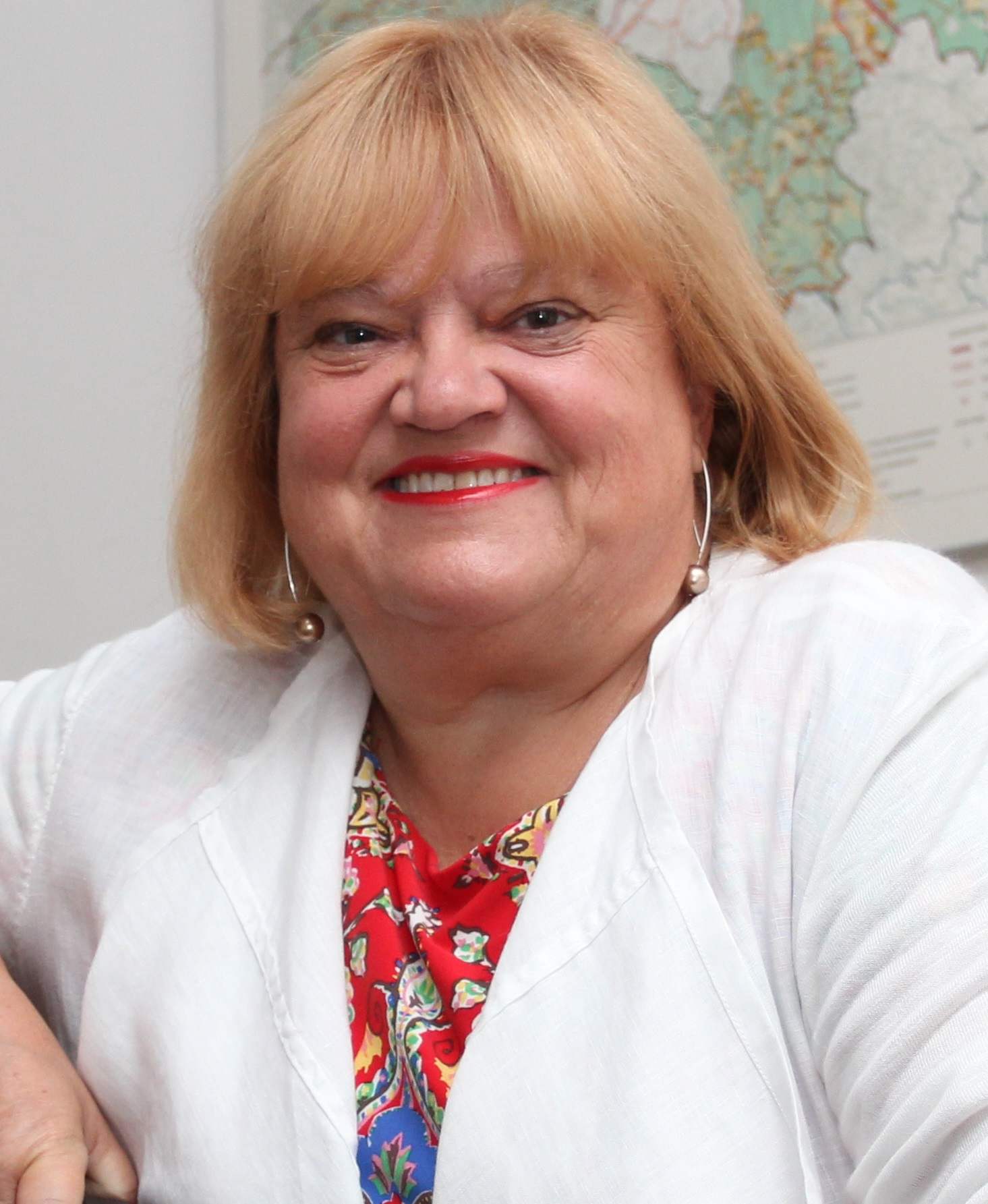
Mrak-Taritaš

== Historians and scientists ==
- Zvonimir Janko (1932–2022), mathematician.
- Željko Karaula (born 1973), historian.
- Božidar Puretić (1921-1971), physician.
- Branko Souček (1930-2014), pioneer of Croatian computer science.
- Đuro Šurmin (1867-1937), literary historian and politician.
- Hrvoje Tkalčić (born 1970), geophysicist and professor at the Australian National University in Canberra.

== Athletes ==
- Mirko Bašić (born 1960), handball player who won several medals representing Yugoslavia, including a gold at the 1984 Summer Olympics.
- Luka Božić (born 1996), basketball player.
- Dario Čanađija (born 1994), football player.
- Zvonko Canjuga (born 1921), football player.
- Marko Capan (born 2004), football player.
- Zdravko Ceraj (1920-2011) who competed for SFR Yugoslavia in the 1952 Summer Olympics. and won two medals at the Mediterranean Games
- Zdravko Divjak (born 1956), swimmer who competed at the 1976 Summer Olympics.
- Bogumir Doležal (1889-1959), footballer, sportsman and journalist.
- Bojan Đurković (born 1989), sports shooter.
- Mladen Frančić (born 1955), football player.
- Petar Gorša (born 1988), sports shooter.
- Ivan Gubijan (1923-2009), hammer thrower, won a silver medal at the 1948 Summer Olympics.
- Hrvoje Horvat (born 1946), handball player who won several medals with Yugoslavia.
- Hrvoje Horvat, Jr. (born 1977), handball player and coach.
- Franjo Jurjević (1932–2022), gymnast.
- Bojan Knežević (born 1997), football player.
- Darko Kralj (born 1971), paralympic athlete, won a gold medal at Beijing 2008.
- Marin Lalić (born 1969), football midfielder.
- Zvezdan Ljubobratović (born 1971), football player.
- Zdravko Mamić (born 1959), football administrator and sports manager.
- Zoran Mamić (born 1971), football player and coach.
- Alen Maras (born 1982), football player.
- Miran Maričić (born 1997), sports shooter.
- Alen Mrzlečki (born 1974), football manager and player.
- Filip Ozobić (born 1991), footballer who played for Croatia's national football team.
- Božidar Peter (1938-2012), handball player who played with Yugoslavia's national team.
- Miroslav Pribanić (born 1946), handball player who was part of the Yugoslav national team that won a gold at the 1972 Summer Olympics.
- Borut Puc (born 1991), tennis player.
- Marko Roginić (born 1995), football player.
- Rudolf Rupec (1895-1983), footballer who played ten matches for the Austrian national team.
- Luka Šebetić (born 1952), handball player and coach who played with RK Zamet.
- Marijan Seđak (born 1976), handball player playing for HC Motor Zaporizhzhia and Croatia's national team.
- Nataša Vezmar (born 1976), taekwondo practitioner.
- Ognjen Vukojević (born 1983), former football player who played for Dynamo Kyiv and Croatia's national team.
- Jelena Zrnić (born 1975), basketball player.
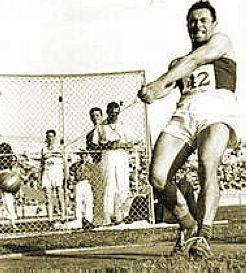
Gubijan

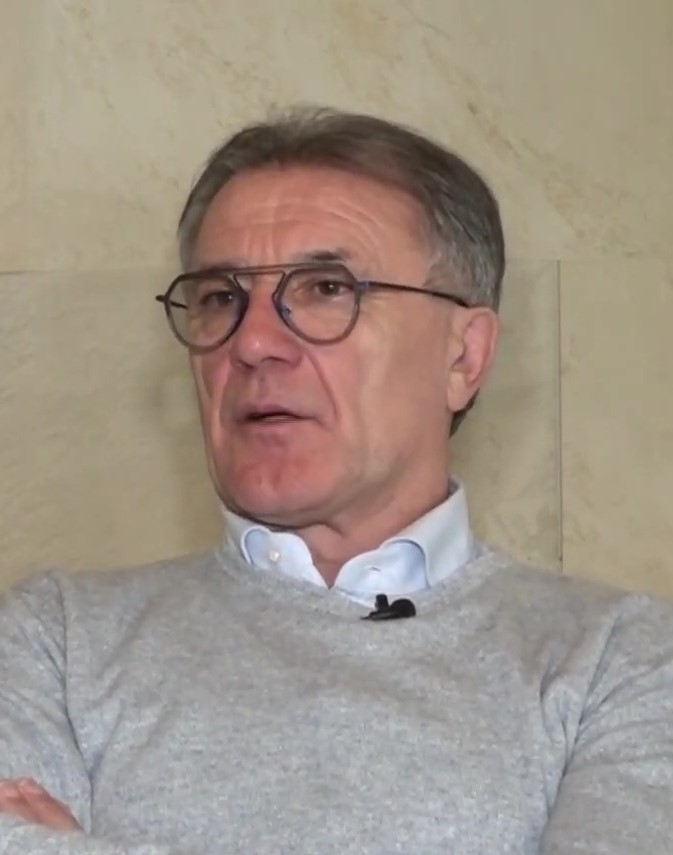
Mamić

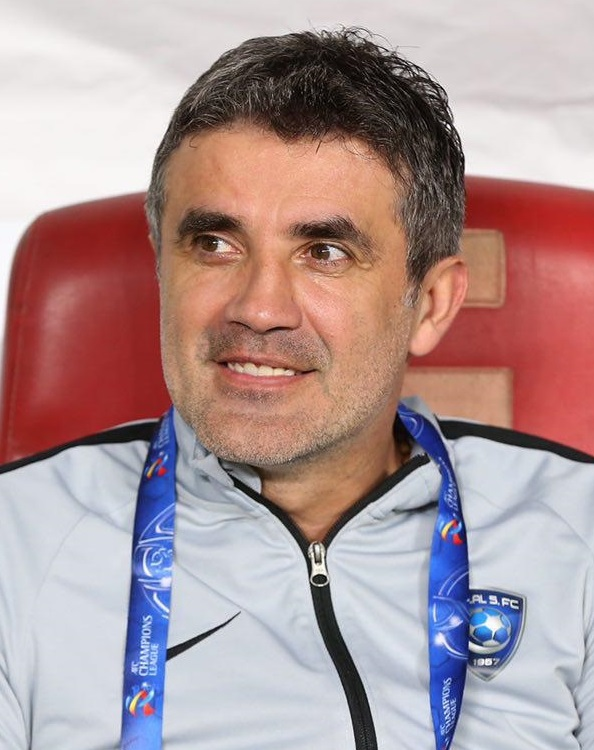
Mamić

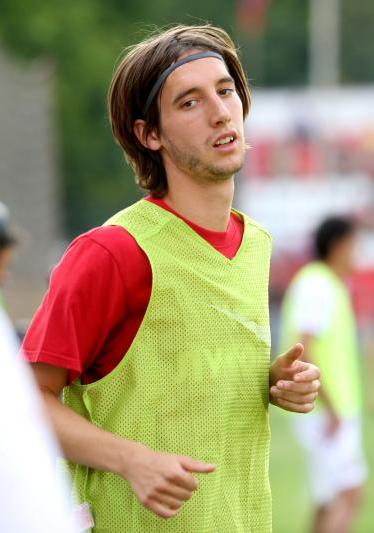
Ozobić

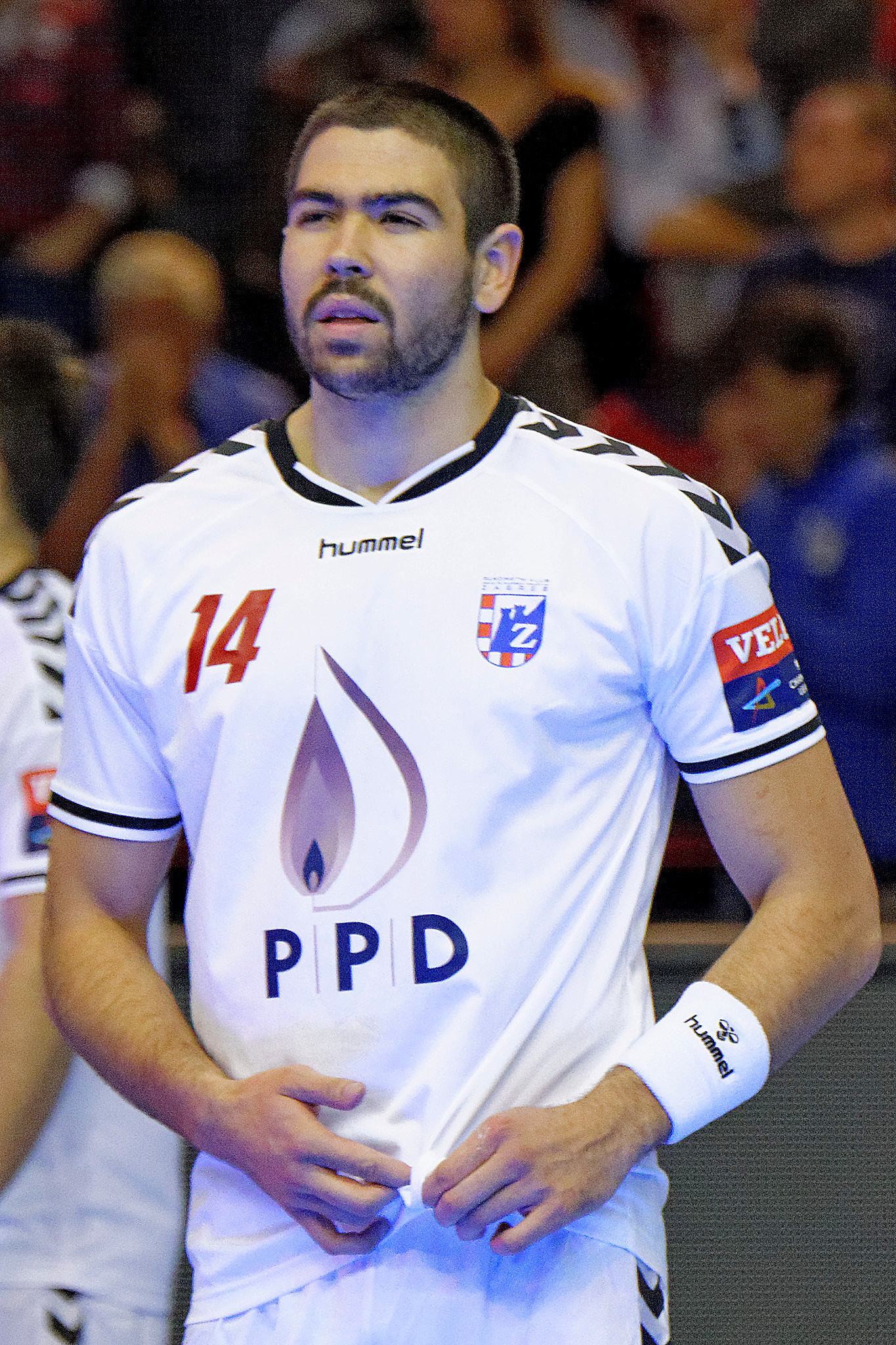
Šebetić

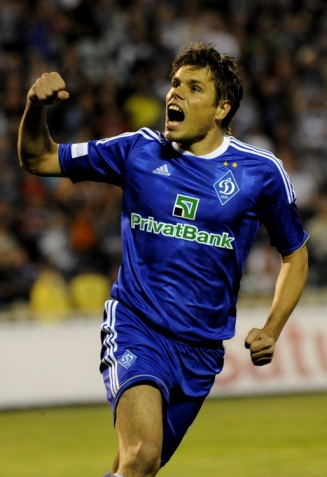
Vukojević

== Religion ==
- Stephen II (bishop of Zagreb) (1190-1247) Bishop of Zagreb.
- Ratko Perić (born 1944), bishop of Mostar-Duvno.
- Rudolf Vimer (1863-1933), writer, polyglot, benefactor, prebendary, rector of the University of Zagreb, dean of the Catholic Faculty of Theology.
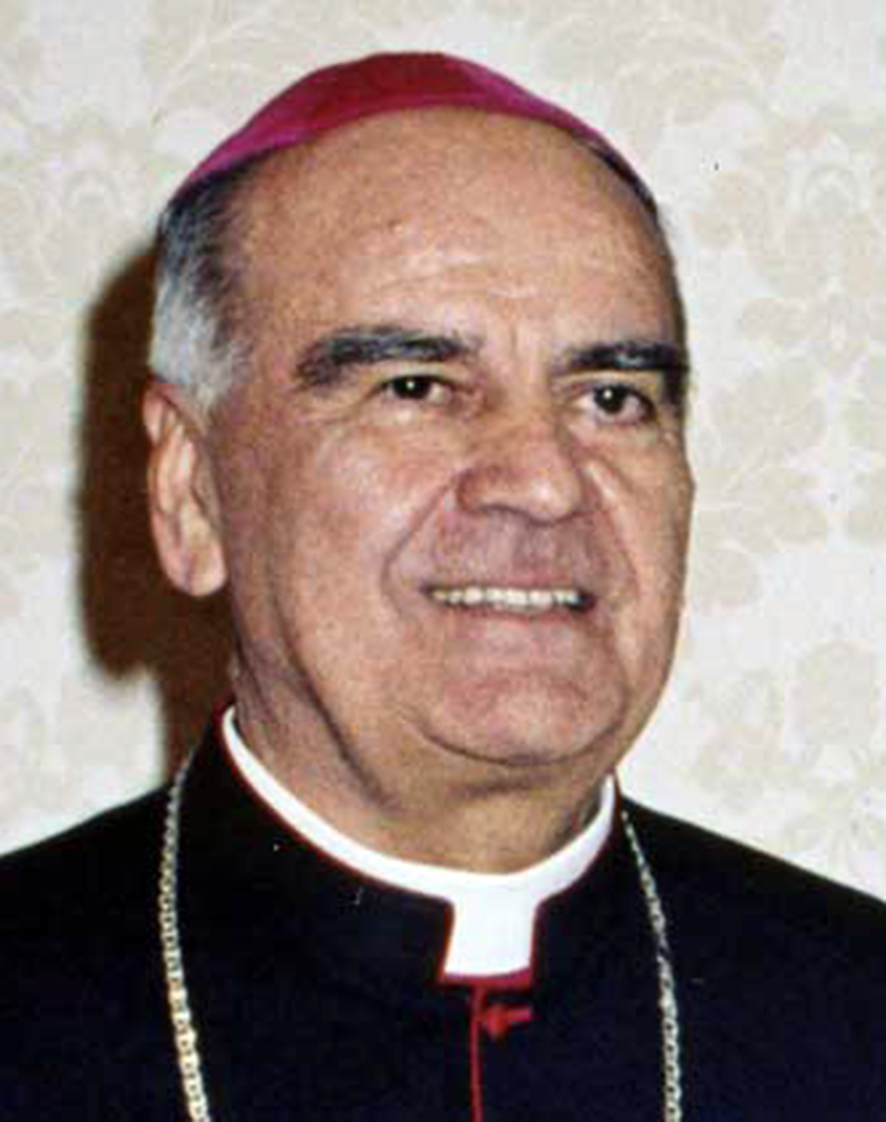
Perić

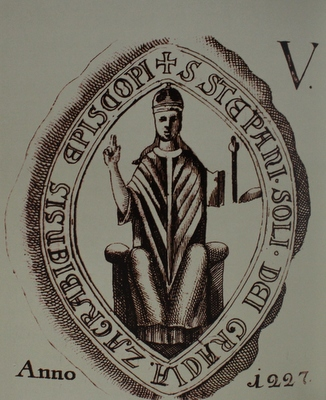
Stephen

== Other ==
- Dragutin Wolf (1866-1927), industrialist.
- David Frankfurter (1909-1982), assassin of Swiss Nazi Wilhelm Gustloff.
- Josip Reihl-Kir (1955-1991), police officer known for his peacemaking initiatives in the opening stages of the Croatian War of Independence.
- Lavoslav Singer (1866-1942), industrialist.
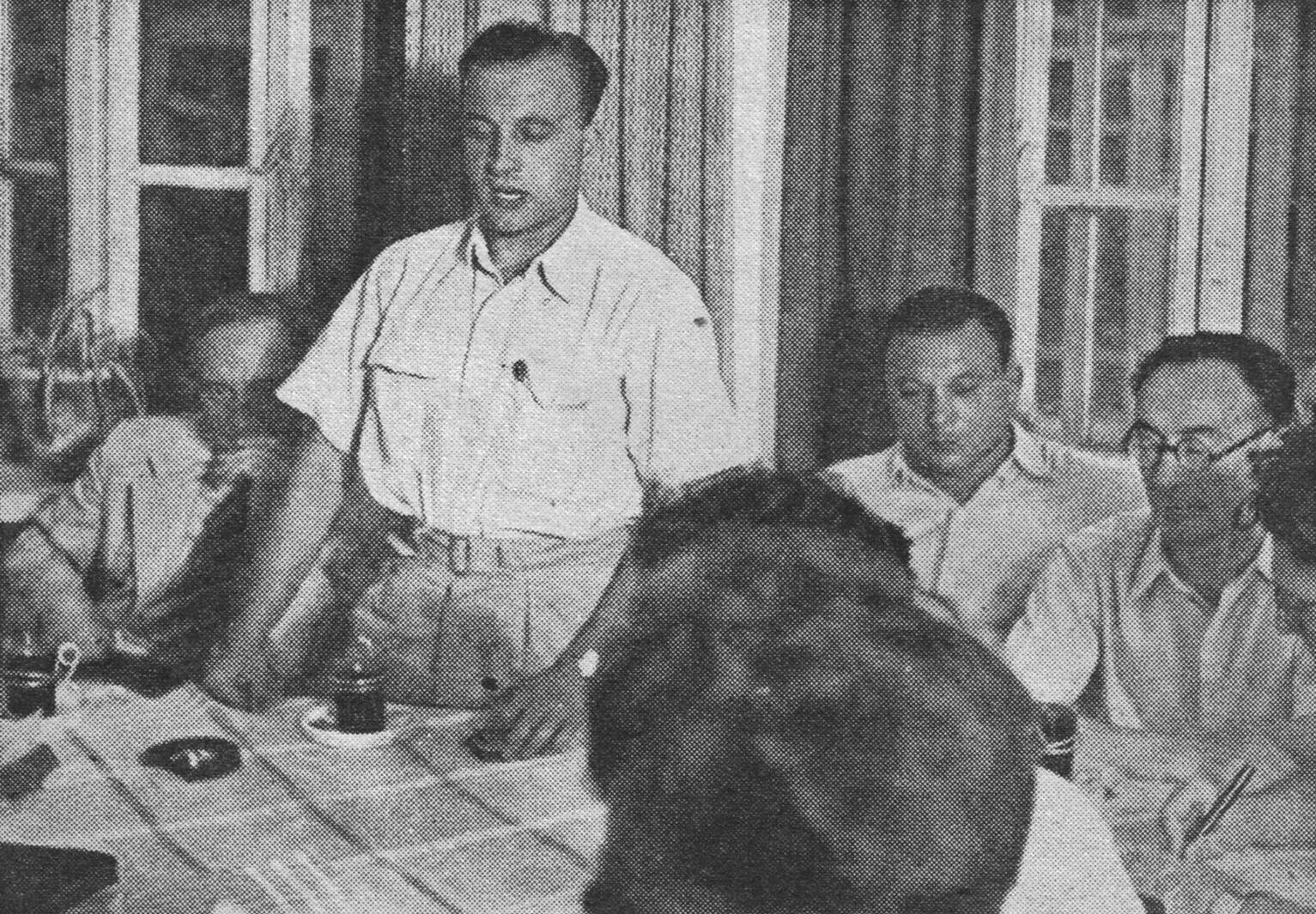
Frankfurter
