= Vinko Pintarić =

Croatian serial killer

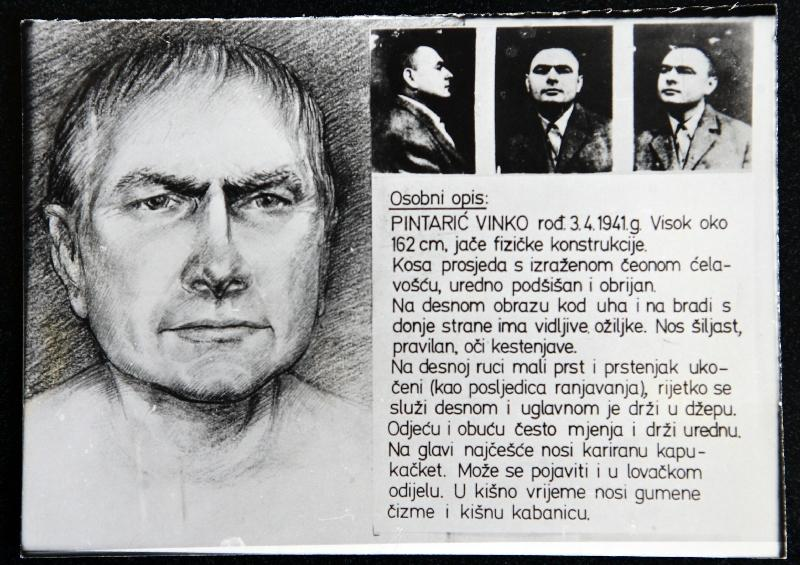
- A 1980s wanted poster of Pintarić
- Born: 3 April 1941; Zrinski Topolovac, Banovina of Croatia, Kingdom of Yugoslavia
- Died: 25 May 1991 (aged 50); Veliko Trgovišće, SR Croatia, SFR Yugoslavia
- Cause of death: Gunshot wounds
- Convictions: Murder; Attempted murder Burglary
- Penalty: Death; commuted to 20 years imprisonment (1974); 20 years imprisonment (1983)

Details
- Victims: 5
- Span of crimes: 1973–1990
- Country: Yugoslavia
- State: SR Croatia
- Date apprehended: May 1973 (escaped September 1973); January 1974 (escaped February 1982); April 1983 (escaped September 1989)

Vinko Pintarić (3 April 1941 – 25 May 1991) was a Croatian serial killer and outlaw who murdered five people over the course of 17 years and escaped from prisons and police stakeouts on multiple occasions. His violent, vindictive nature and proficiency with firearms struck fear into inhabitants of Hrvatsko Zagorje, a region of northern Croatia where he spent years at large, hiding from law enforcement and engaging in various crimes, until his 1991 death in a shootout with the police.

Protracted media coverage of his exploits made Pintarić a household name in Croatia and Yugoslavia and even brought him a degree of sympathy from the general public, who saw him as a Robin Hood-like figure, and dubbed him "Čaruga of Zagorje", after an infamous post-World War I outlaw Jovo Stanisavljević Čaruga.

== Early life ==
Pintarić was born in 1941 in Zrinski Topolovac near Bjelovar. During World War II, his father Ilija joined the (Communist-led) Partisan resistance, but near the end of the war, he was taken away by the (fascist) Ustaše and spent several months with them. Because of this, in June 1945 Ilija was beaten by agents of the Department for the Protection of the People (of the newly-established Communist government) in the presence of his family, including Pintarić and his elder brother Josip, and then taken away. Pintarić's mother urged Ilija's Partisan comrades to intervene on his behalf, but they refused. Ilija never returned; according to rumors, he was shot the day after his arrest.

Pintarić's mother remarried after a couple of years, and his alcoholic stepfather physically abused him. All these traumatic events instilled a permanent sense of betrayal in Pintarić and fueled his anger and resentment; he would often talk about "avenging his father". In his adolescence, he developed an interest in firearms, using them for poaching. On several occasions, Pintarić had his illegally-owned weapons confiscated by the police.

Pintarić's first marriage lasted only a couple of months. Angered by demeaning treatment from his in-laws, he assaulted them, for which he spent some time in prison. He never returned to his wife. Instead, he moved to Zabok and married Katica Tisanić, a divorced woman with a child. They built a house in Zabok and had a daughter. For a while, Pintarić was a good husband and father, a man who wanted to move away from his traumatic childhood and failed marriage.

== First murders ==
Pintarić committed his first murder on 26 April 1973. On that day, he applied for a job in a local factory but was rejected. Disappointed over his repeated failures to secure a job in the factory and suspecting undue influence of his brothers-in-law, who were already employed there, he went to a local inn and drank heavily. On his way home, he got into a quarrel and physical confrontation with his neighbours. Pintarić went to his home to get a pistol, shot the neighbour dead, and wounded his neighbour's tenant. He hid for 18 days before turning himself in to the police. He was committed to Vrapče Psychiatric Hospital for evaluation, but he escaped from the institution on 18 September 1973 and went into hiding again.

Pintarić was suspicious towards his wife, believing that she was helping the police to capture or even kill him. On 24 October 1973, Pintarić shot her dead through the window of his brother's house and fled into the night. Again, Pintarić was drunk when he committed the crime, and had no recollection of the event on the following day. Only after inquiring about what had happened in Zabok, he realized that he had murdered his wife.

Pintarić was captured on 20 January 1974. The police learned of his whereabouts and surrounded the house in which he was hiding. After brief negotiations, Pintarić surrendered without resistance. He was tried for two murders, an attempted murder, and endangering his neighbours by shooting at their homes. He admitted the crimes, but pleaded not guilty, arguing that he was provoked into murder while intoxicated. On 18 November 1974, he was pronounced guilty and sentenced to death, an outcome Pintarić had feared the most. However, to his relief, this was quickly commuted to 20 years imprisonment, the maximum prison term under the law.

== Imprisonment and escape ==
Pintarić served his sentence in Stara Gradiška prison. Due to his good behaviour, he was assigned duties which were not accessible to other prisoners, such as preparing coffee and growing flowers. Still, after eight years in prison, some problems emerged, as Pintarić was issuing threats to his former neighbours. At the same time, he was petitioning for a leave. The authorities were aware of his threats and denied all his petitions, assessing that he might commit more crimes upon release.

On 21 February 1982, Pintarić managed to escape from the prison by simply adding his name to a list of prisoners to be released on a leave. Five days later, he wrote a letter to his attorney, saying that he escaped because writing petitions made no sense any more. He announced that he was going to kill "a lot of people", and that what he had done was just the beginning.

Pintarić got involved with Barbara Šipek, a woman from the village of Andraševec, near Donja Stubica. They lived together in her house, and even went stealing together. She knew about his identity, as did the villagers. When she was apprehended by the police in April 1983, Pintarić barged into the nearby Kucelj family house armed with a shotgun, and threatened to kill "thirty people" unless she was released. However, Milan and Matija Kucelj managed to surprise Pintarić and overpower him, hacking him with a cleaver in the process. They left him for dead and promptly alarmed the Oroslavje police. Pintarić was severely injured, but he survived. As a result of his injuries, he lost full use of his right arm.

== Imprisonment in Lepoglava and final escape ==
Pintarić was charged with threats, attempted murder, and 30 counts of burglary. He was again sentenced to 20 years and sent to Lepoglava prison. Life behind bars bored him, so he decided to escape again. On 3 September 1989, he was given a day's leave from which he did not return.

Pintarić went back to his outlaw lifestyle. He kept breaking into cottages across Hrvatsko Zagorje, carefully picking those which had a clear view towards the road and were close to a forest, making the escape easier.

In June 1990 the police received a tip about Pintarić having been seen in Prosenik Začretski, near Zabok. They talked to Rudolf Belina, owner of a nearby cottage. A couple of days later, he was visited and shot dead by Pintarić, who thought Belina had betrayed him to the authorities. Shortly after that, Pintarić murdered Barbara Šipek's neighbour for having killed one of her chickens. His fifth and final victim was Božo Habek, shot dead on 2 August 1990 simply for asking the already paranoid Pintarić if he was looking for somebody.

The police were closing in on Pintarić, and twice came very near to apprehending him. However, on both of these occasions, Pintarić opened fire, wounded a policeman, and managed to escape.

== Death ==
By 1991, the Zabok police had set up a team dedicated to locating and capturing Pintarić. Over time, they learned more about his habits. He was getting increasingly careless, partly due to alcohol abuse. In May 1991, they received information that Pintarić was visiting his lover Ankica Buhiniček and decided to set up a stakeout on her house near Veliko Trgovišće. On the third night, the policemen saw a man coming from the woods and approaching the house. After they radioed for backup, they were joined by a special forces team from Kumrovec, and the compound was quickly surrounded.

When Pintarić exited the house in the morning, he was called to surrender, but he opened fire instead. There was a brief exchange in which Pintarić was wounded and he ran back into the house. He still refused to surrender and asked for his attorney. When the attorney came, Pintarić asked him to come to the house, which the police did not allow. By noon of the same day, it was apparent that voluntary surrender was very unlikely, and the police fired tear gas into the compound. Pintarić then shot Buhiniček in the stomach, accusing her of "ratting" on him, and fired on the police. One of the policemen then entered the house and killed Pintarić with a single gunshot to the head. Buhiniček survived the shooting.

Pintarić is buried in the Lepoglava cemetery, in an unmarked grave.

== See also ==
- Milka Pavlović
- Vinko Palić
- List of serial killers by country
