= Križ Gornji =

- Village
- Location within Croatia
- Coordinates: 46.0469127°N 16.7485223°E
- Country: Croatia
- County: Bjelovar-Bilogora County
- Municipality: Zrinski Topolovac

Area
  - Total: 2.5 sq mi (6.4 km^{2})

Population (2021)
  - Total: 125
  - Density: 51/sq mi (20/km^{2})
- Time zone: UTC+1 (CET)
  - Summer (DST): UTC+2 (CEST)

Križ Gornji is a village in Croatia.

== Demographics ==
According to the 2021 census, its population was 125.
