= Jakopovac =

- Village
- Location within Croatia
- Coordinates: 46.0244343°N 16.7722427°E
- Country: Croatia
- County: Bjelovar-Bilogora County
- Municipality: Zrinski Topolovac

Area
  - Total: 1.7 sq mi (4.4 km^{2})

Population (2021)
  - Total: 98
  - Density: 58/sq mi (22/km^{2})
- Time zone: UTC+1 (CET)
  - Summer (DST): UTC+2 (CEST)

Jakopovac is a village in Croatia.

== Demographics ==
According to the 2021 census, its population was 98.
