= Milka Pavlović =

Croatian serial killer

- Mugshot (c. 1934)
- Born: 1905; Kokinac, Kingdom of Croatia-Slavonia, Austria-Hungary
- Died: 18 May 1935 (aged 29–30); Bjelovar, Kingdom of Yugoslavia
- Cause of death: Execution by hanging
- Spouse: Rade Pavlović (died 1934)
- Convictions: Murder; Attempted murder
- Penalty: Death

Details
- Victims: 6
- Span of crimes: March – July 1934
- Country: Yugoslavia
- Date apprehended: July 1934

Milka Pavlović (1905 – 18 May 1935) was a Croatian serial killer. A peasant woman living in Stari Pavljani, near Bjelovar, she poisoned family members, relatives and servants with arsenic between March and July 1934, succeeding in killing six and wounding ten others so she could acquire their inheritance. After being convicted of the crimes, she was sentenced to death and subsequently executed.

== Biography ==
Little documentation of Pavlović's early life exists. She was born in 1905 in the small village of Kokinac, and at some point, she married Rade Pavlović of nearby Stari Pavljani, moving into his home and finding work as a milkmaid. A childless, bitter woman, Milka was regarded poorly by her fellow villagers.

Around March 1934, she bought arsenic from a local pharmacy under an alias, claiming that it was for killing rats. She then took the poison home and put it into the food served to her husband Rade, who soon after began vomiting violently and died. His death was not regarded as suspicious, and Milka inherited his estate since the couple had no children. Over the next few months, dozens of other relatives and their servants were poisoned in the same fashion, mainly the Jagodić household. As a result, four people were admitted to a clinic in Zagreb with complaints of terrible cramps in their stomachs: the widow Slavka Jagodić, her daughter Sava, an unnamed servant and a close relative of the family. Shortly after their admission, all of the victims died. The nine other living members of the Jagodić family survived, but were left with the aftereffects of the poisoning. However, on 2 July that year, another strange death occurred: the family's Romani blacksmith, Miso Gjurgjević, died writhing in agony, much like the others before him. This raised suspicions from local villagers, who were quick to point out a possible culprit: the widow Milka Pavlović, whose husband had passed in eerily similar circumstances just months before. Milka was arrested, and the prosecutor's office ordered that all of the deceased be exhumed and tested for traces of arsenic poisoning. While she protested her innocence at first, Pavlović eventually admitted that she had poisoned her victims because of her desire to acquire their wealth, a statement backed up when the autopsies concluded that Rade Pavlović, the Jagodić family members and Miso Gjurgjević had been poisoned with lethal quantities of arsenic. According to Milka, she poured the poison into biscuits, salt and any other food while she was alone cooking in the kitchen, and thereafter served it to her unaware victims.

After a six-day long trial, Milka Pavlović was found guilty on all counts and sentenced to death. During her trial, it was additionally revealed that she had planned to dispose of a two-year-old child, the heir to an inheritance, with a poisoned loaf, but was stopped in the nick of time by the child's mother. For her crimes, she was brought to Bjelovar, where she was executed by hanging on 18 May 1935.

== See also ==
- Vinko Pintarić
- List of serial killers by country
