= List of prefects of Bjelovar-Bilogora County =

This is a list of prefects of Bjelovar-Bilogora County.

== Prefects of Bjelovar-Bilogora County (1993–present) ==
Croatian Peasant Party (HSS)
Croatian Democratic Union (HDZ)
Croatian People's Party – Liberal Democrats (HNS – LD)

No.	Portrait	Name (Born–Died)	Term of Office		Party
1		Tihomir Trnski (1955–1994)	4 May 1993	13 May 1994	HSS
—		Stanislav Pavlić (1939–1997); Acting Prefect	13 May 1994	18 July 1994	HDZ
2		Željko Ledinski (1960–)	18 July 1994	5 June 1997	HSS
3		Marijan Coner (1956–)	5 June 1997	6 June 2000	HDZ
4		Damir Bajs (1964–)	6 June 2000	12 January 2008	HSS
—		Krešo Jelavić (1957–); Acting Prefect	12 January 2008	19 February 2009	HDZ
—		Zvonimir Karakaš (1968–); Acting Prefect	12 January 2008	19 February 2009	HNS – LD
5		Miroslav Čačija (1947–)	19 February 2009	2 June 2013	HSS
(4)		Damir Bajs (1964–)	2 June 2013	4 June 2021	HSS
6		Marko Marušić (1985–)	4 June 2021	Incumbent	HDZ

== See also ==
- Bjelovar-Bilogora County
