= Zastava M70 =

Zastava M70 may refer to:

- Zastava M70 (assault rifle), a series of assault rifles based on the AK-47
- Zastava M70 (pistol), also designated CZ M70, a pistol loosely based on the earlier Zastava M57
- Zastava M70 (hunting rifle), a hunting rifle produced since 1970
