= Split shooting =

2020 mass shooting in Croatia

2020 Split shooting
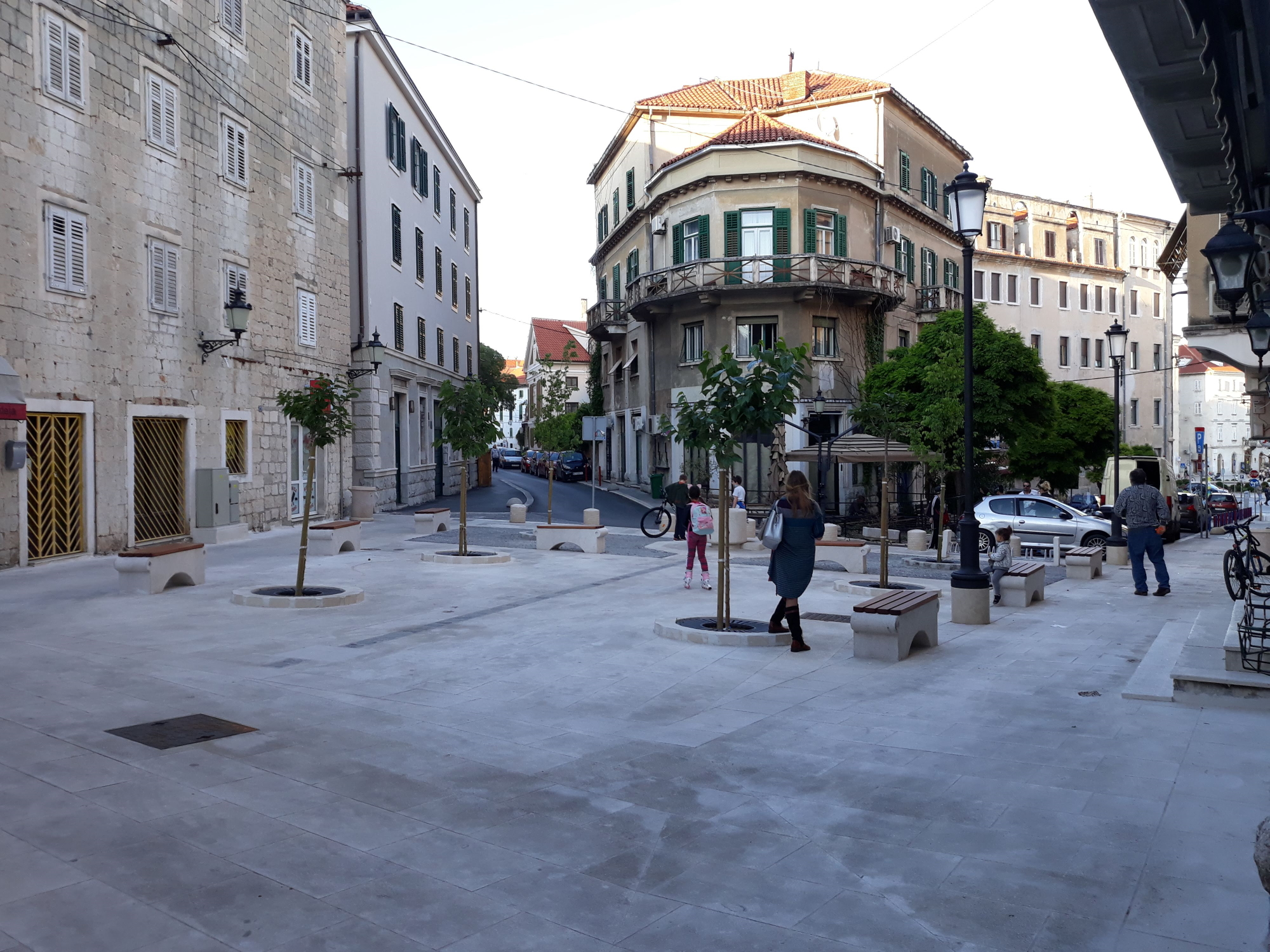
- Trg Šperun, where the shooting took place
- Location: Trg Šperun Split, Croatia
- Date: 11 January 2020 c. 15:35 (CET)
- Target: Drug dealers
- Attack type: Mass shooting, Mass Murder, Vigilantism
- Weapon: 7.62×39mm AK-47 Semi-automatic rifle
- Deaths: 3
- Injuries: 0
- Perpetrator: Filip Zavadlav
- Motive: Act of Revenge toward drug dealers harassing Zavadlav and his family members
- Charges: Three counts of murder, illegal possession of a semi-automatic rifle, and causing general danger
- Verdict: Zavadlav sentenced to 35 years in prison

On 11 January 2020 a mass shooting (Croatian: Pucnjava u Splitu) occurred in the city of Split in Croatia, when 25 year-old Filip Zavadlav, reportedly a professional sailor, opened fire on three men in the city's residential neighborhood of Varoš, killing all three.

The perpetrator was arrested shortly after the attack by the police. Authorities described the incident as a targeted act of revenge linked to disputes within organized crime groups in Split. The shooting shocked the country and prompted public debate about the rise of violent crime and the influence of criminal networks in coastal Croatian cities.

== Background ==
The perpetrator had no confirmed ties to organized crime according to early reports. The victims Jurica Torlak, Marin Paić (known as "Pajser"), and Marin Boban were reportedly connected to the local drug scene and had allegedly threatened Zavadlav's brother over unpaid debt, Marin Paić reportedly had charges pertaining over the death of an 8 year old girl via Vehicular manslaughter.

According to witnesses, the Zavadlav family had been harassed for months prior to the attack, and Filip had complained to friends and relatives about violent threats from criminal groups in Split's underworld.

== Shooting ==
On the afternoon of 11 January 2020, Zavadlav carried out a mass shooting in the Varoš district of Split. Armed with an AK-47 rifle, he shot and killed three men associated with the local drug scene. The first victim, Marin Paić, was shot while riding a Suzuki Burgman scooter in Radmilovićeva Street. The second and third, Jurica Torlak and Marin Boban, were shot minutes later near Šperun Square while traveling on a Yamaha XT.

Eyewitness footage circulated on social media showing a young man walking calmly through Split carrying a rifle. Police later confirmed the suspect as Zavadlav. Reports indicate he may have planned to target two additional individuals but did not carry out further attacks.In total, Zavadlav fired 36 shots.

== Perpetrator ==
Filip Zavadlav, (born c. 1995) was a seaman from Split, and had no confirmed ties to organized crime according to early reports. Zavadlav was raised in the Skalice neighborhood of Split, alongside two younger brothers, Stanislav and Anton Ivan. His upbringing was characterized by severe domestic instability, poverty, and systemic failure of social services. Zavadlav's father was a merchant seafarer and was frequently absent, while his mother was highly abusive. In 2008, at the age of 13, Zavadlav reported his mother to the authorities after a violent incident, leading to a police intervention and a subsequent 10-month suspended prison sentence for his mother. Despite at least 11 documented interventions by social welfare services during his childhood, the household environment remained dysfunctional.

As they reached adolescence, both of Zavadlav's brothers developed severe drug addictions and became involved in local criminal networks, which frequently brought drug dealers and extortionists into contact with the family home. Acquaintances and neighbors later described Zavadlav as an introverted youth who actively attempted to distance himself from his family's criminal environment.

Zavadlav completed secondary education and enrolled at the Maritime Faculty in Split. Seeking to escape his domestic situation, he received assistance from a local Catholic nun, who helped him secure a rental apartment in the Varoš neighborhood of Split. In 2018, Zavadlav gained employment as a deck officer on a cargo ship, working at sea for 14 months. Zavadlav used his maritime earnings to maintain his independent living arrangements and to provide financial support to his family, including a brother who was incarcerated at the time. However, upon his return to Split, Zavadlav was reportedly subjected to continuous harassment and extortion by local drug dealers demanding payment for debts incurred by his brothers.

== Threats and Family Harassment ==
Court testimony later revealed that Zavadlav's family had endured ongoing intimidation and threats linked to local narcotics groups. His brother had reportedly been assaulted several times by members of the same circle as the victims. Defense attorneys claimed the accused had suffered psychological distress and "diminished capacity" from prolonged stress and fear.

== Arrest and legal proceedings ==
After the killings, Zavadlav reportedly left the crime scene and went toward the city center. Several media outlets claimed he briefly entered a local bar before surrendering to police without resistance, though official reports stated he was captured later that evening. He was taken into custody by the Croatian police and later transferred to a psychiatric hospital for evaluation. Police described the murders as a deliberate act of revenge following long-term conflicts involving his family.

Zavadlav's trial began in 2021 under heavy security. Both he and his police escort wore bulletproof vests due to threats of retaliation from criminal associates of the victims. The prosecution sought a long-term prison sentence for triple aggravated murder, while the defense requested psychiatric reevaluation. The proceedings included testimony from witnesses, forensic experts, and police officers. As of the most recent reports, the final verdict had not been publicly confirmed.

== Reactions ==
The incident shocked Croatia and ignited a major public debate about organized crime and the state's ability to protect citizens. On social media, some users portrayed Zavadlav as a "hero" who acted against known criminals, while others condemned the killings as unjustifiable vigilantism. Authorities, including the Mayor of Split and the Ministry of the Interior, urged the public not to glorify violence and promised a stronger crackdown on organized criminal groups.

== See also ==
- Vigilantism
