= Eva Fischer =

Croatia-born Italian artist (1920–2015)

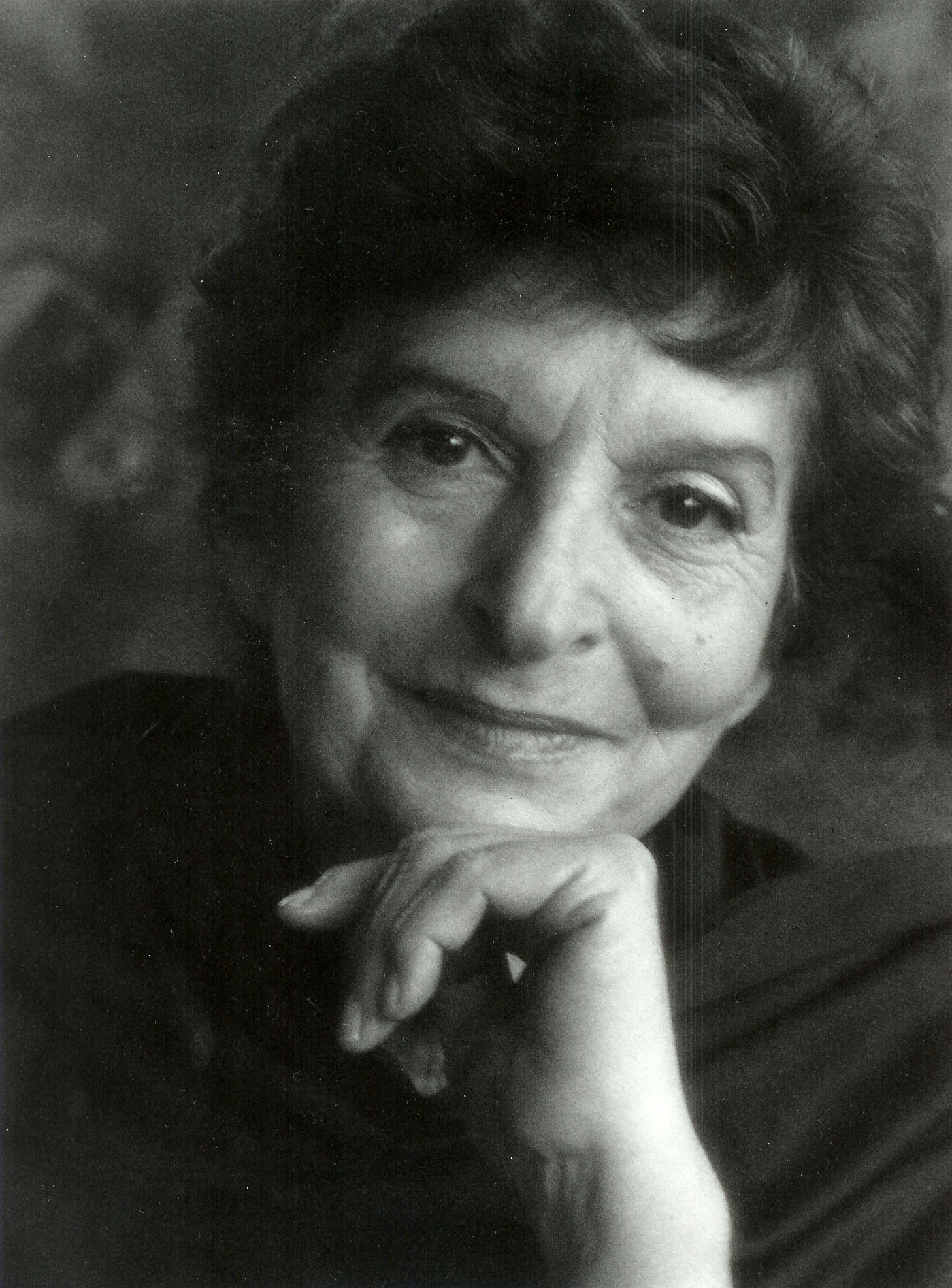
Eva Fischer

Eva Fischer (Daruvar, 19 November 1920 – Rome, 7 July 2015) was a Croatia-born Italian artist who worked in oils, watercolours, engraving and lithography.

== Life and work ==
Eva Fischer was born in Daruvar (present-day Croatia) in 1920. Her father, Leopold, was the community's Chief Rabbi and a noted Talmudist. He was deported by the Nazis from Yugoslavia before the outbreak of World War II along with more than thirty members of her family. Very few survived the concentration camps. Fischer was able to graduate from the Academy of Fine Arts in Lyon, just before the outbreak of World War II.

Fischer was apprehended in Belgrade and interned with her mother and her younger brother in the Vallegrande prison camp on the Croatian island of Korčula, then under the administration of Fascist Italy. She and her brother were allowed to assist her sick mother in the Split hospital. They were later granted permission to be transferred to Bologna. In 1943, following the outbreak of the Italian Civil War, Fischer went into hiding with her family and adopted the cover surname "Venturi". She began to collaborate with the “Partito d’Azione” (a Resistance movement against the Nazi occupation) and met with Partisan Wanda Varotti and Massimo Massei.

At the end of the war Fischer moved to Rome. She joined a group of artists in Via Margutta, and became a close friend of Giovanni Omiccioli. A defining moment was her meeting with Pablo Picasso during a party at Luchino Visconti's home. They talked for most of the night and he encouraged her to continue with her work and pursue her investigation into boats and Southern architecture in her painting. She moved to Paris, where she lived for a long time in Saint Germain des Près and befriended Marc Chagall and Ossip Zadkine.

In the 1960s, Fischer exhibited at the Lefevre Gallery in London, where the Italian painter Modigliani held his last one man exhibition. In 1992 Italian composer Ennio Morricone wrote and recorded music for one of her exhibitions, later to be collected in the album/exhibition catalogue A Eva Fischer, pittore.
