= Zrinski Topolovac =

- Municipality
- Location within Croatia
- Country: Croatia
- County: Bjelovar-Bilogora County

Government
  - Mayor: Jasna Mikles Horvat (HDZ)

Area
  - Total: 7.5 sq mi (19.5 km^{2})

Population (2021)
  - Total: 524
  - Density: 69.6/sq mi (26.9/km^{2})
- Time zone: UTC+1 (CET)
  - Summer (DST): UTC+2 (CEST)

Zrinski Topolovac is a village and a municipality in Bjelovar-Bilogora County, Croatia.

== History ==
In the late 19th and early 20th centuries, Zrinski Topolovac was part of the Bjelovar-Križevci County of the Kingdom of Croatia-Slavonia.

=== Zrinski Topolvac Clergy Shooting ===
During a New Year's Eve celebration in 1993, 28-year-old Croatian Soldier Vinko Palić shot and killed nine people including an on-duty police officer and critically wounded seven others, before running off to a street and committing suicide.

After the shooting a 15 year long court dispute was filed against the government by the victim's families. By the end of the court hearing, the government was cleared of all liabilty but was forced to pay 639,600 Croatian kuna for unreasonable court delays.

== Demographics ==
According to the 2021 census, the population of the municipality was 747 with 524 living in the town proper. In 2011 there were 890 inhabitants, of whom 99.89% were ethnic Croats.

The municipality consists of the following settlements:

- Jakopovac, population 98
- Križ Gornji, population 125
- Zrinski Topolovac, population 524
Zrinski Topolovac: Population trends 1857–2021
v

population	1580	1745	1659	1900	2024	2120	2067	1997	1878	1896	1736	1515	1291	1087	1000	890	747
	1857	1869	1880	1890	1900	1910	1921	1931	1948	1953	1961	1971	1981	1991	2001	2011	2021

Sources: Croatian Bureau of Statistics publications
