= Ferdo Rusan =

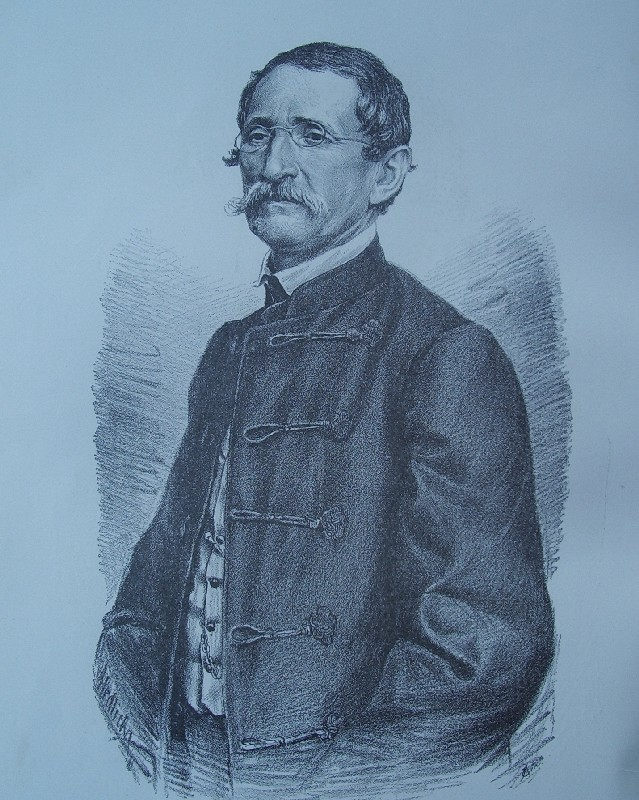

Background information
- Born: Ferdo Rusan; 10 December 1810; Pavlin Kloštar near Bjelovar, Military Frontier, Austrian Empire
- Died: 2 May 1879 (aged 68) Virje, Military Frontier, Austria-Hungary
- Occupation(s): Composer, musician

Ferdo Rusan (1810–1879) was a Croatian reformer, composer and musician.

Ferdo Rusan was son of an officer, born in small village Pavlin Kloštar near the town of Bjelovar in Croatia on 10 December 1810. He died in Virje, Croatia on 2 May 1879. He completed the cadet school in Bjelovar and in 1828 he became a cadet. After being a soldier for some time, in 1842 he left the army.

Ferdo Rusan was the main recorder of renaissance movements in Varaždin Military Frontier area and Bjelovar Military Commune. He publicised by speech and pen the details and opinions of civil and military classes that clearly show how the people of the region became part of the growing and progressing Croatian Movement.

Ferdo Rusan was involved with Illyrian movement in Croatia. In Bjelovar there is the memorial tablet in the street that bears his name. One street in Zagreb also bears his name. His biography was written by Mira Kolar-Dimitrijević in 2004.
