= Bjelovar-Bilogora County =

County in central Croatia

Coordinates: 45°54′10″N 16°50′51″E

Bjelovar-Bilogora County Bjelovarsko-bilogorska županija (Croatian)
- County
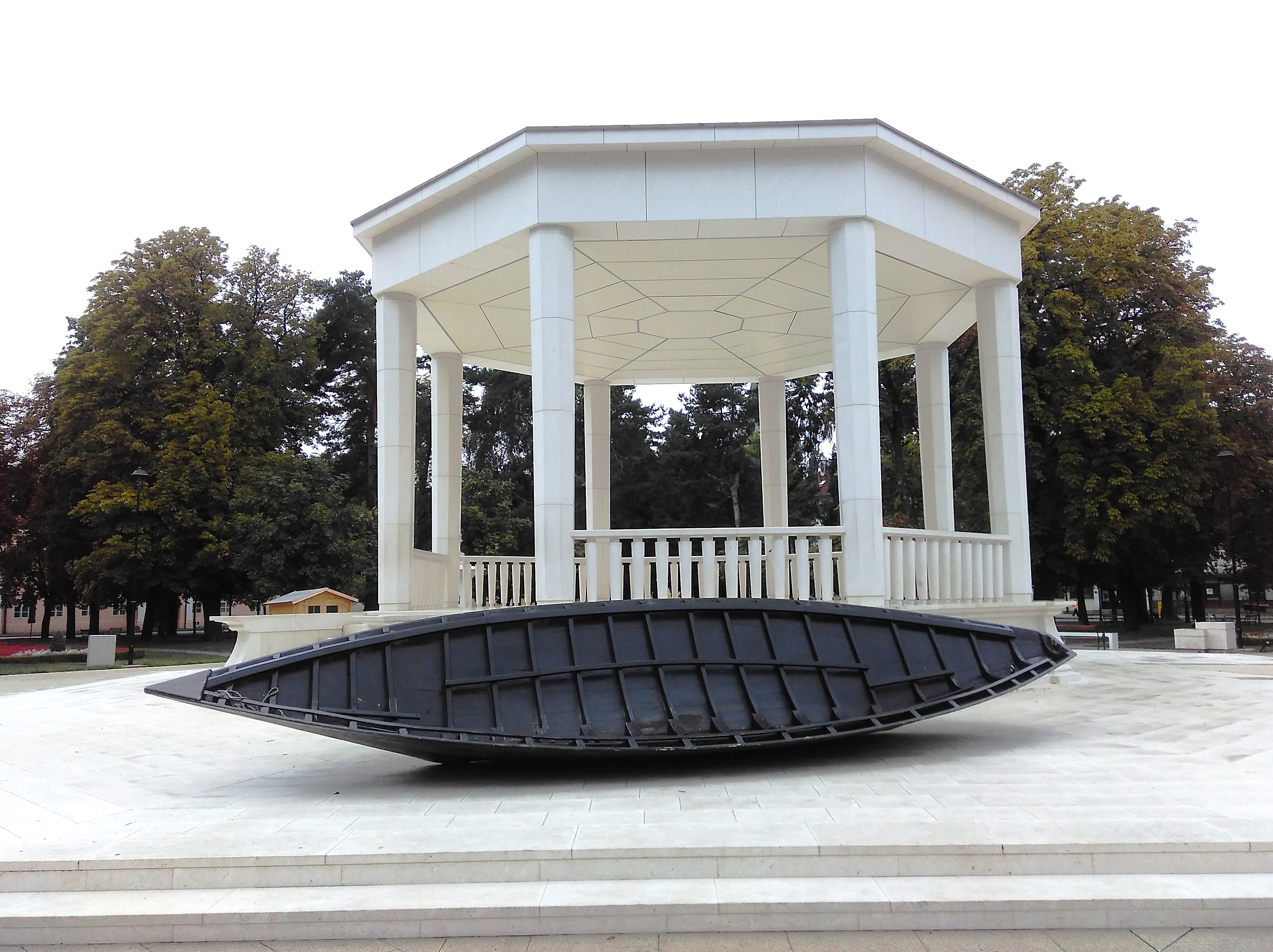
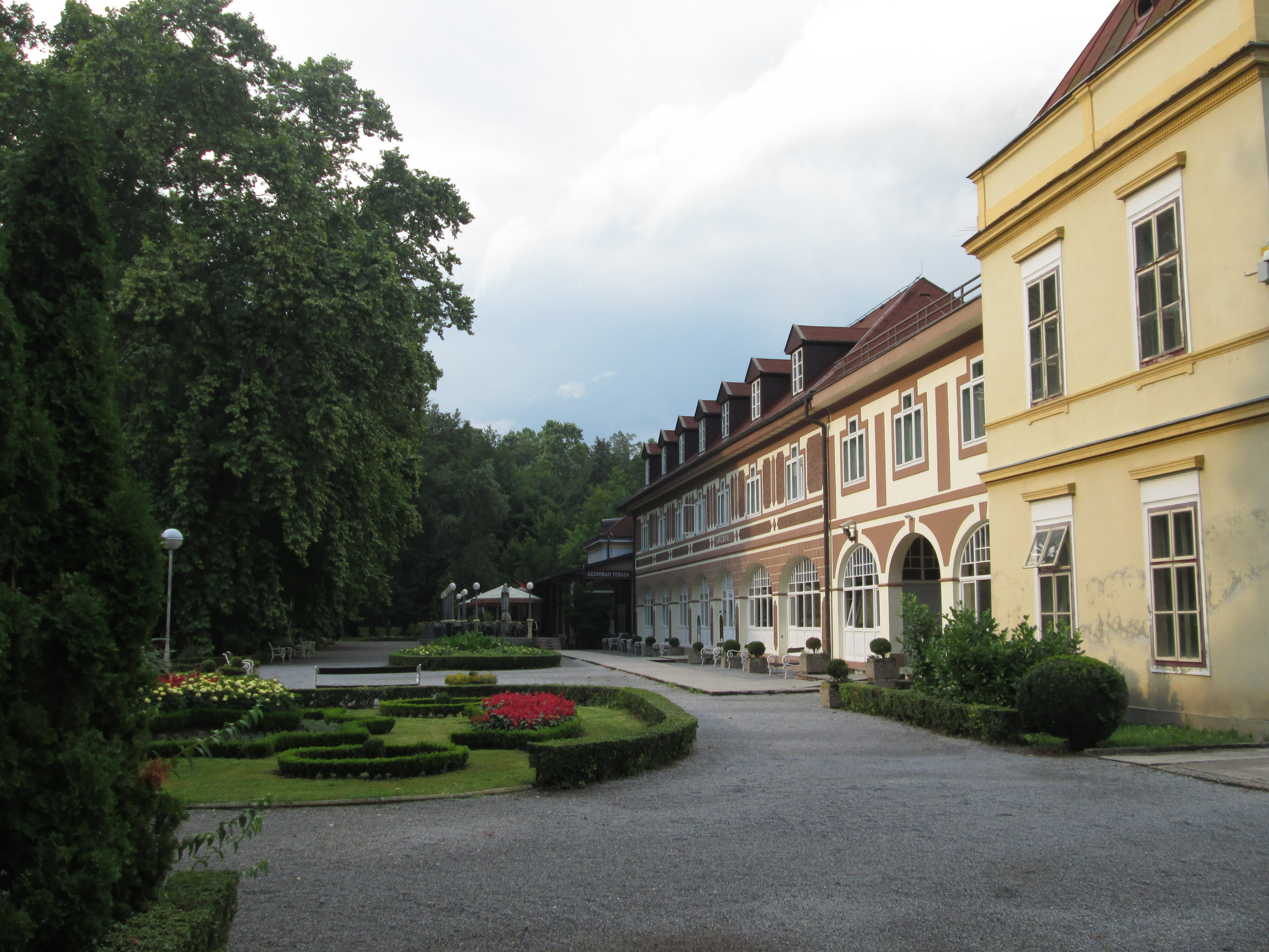
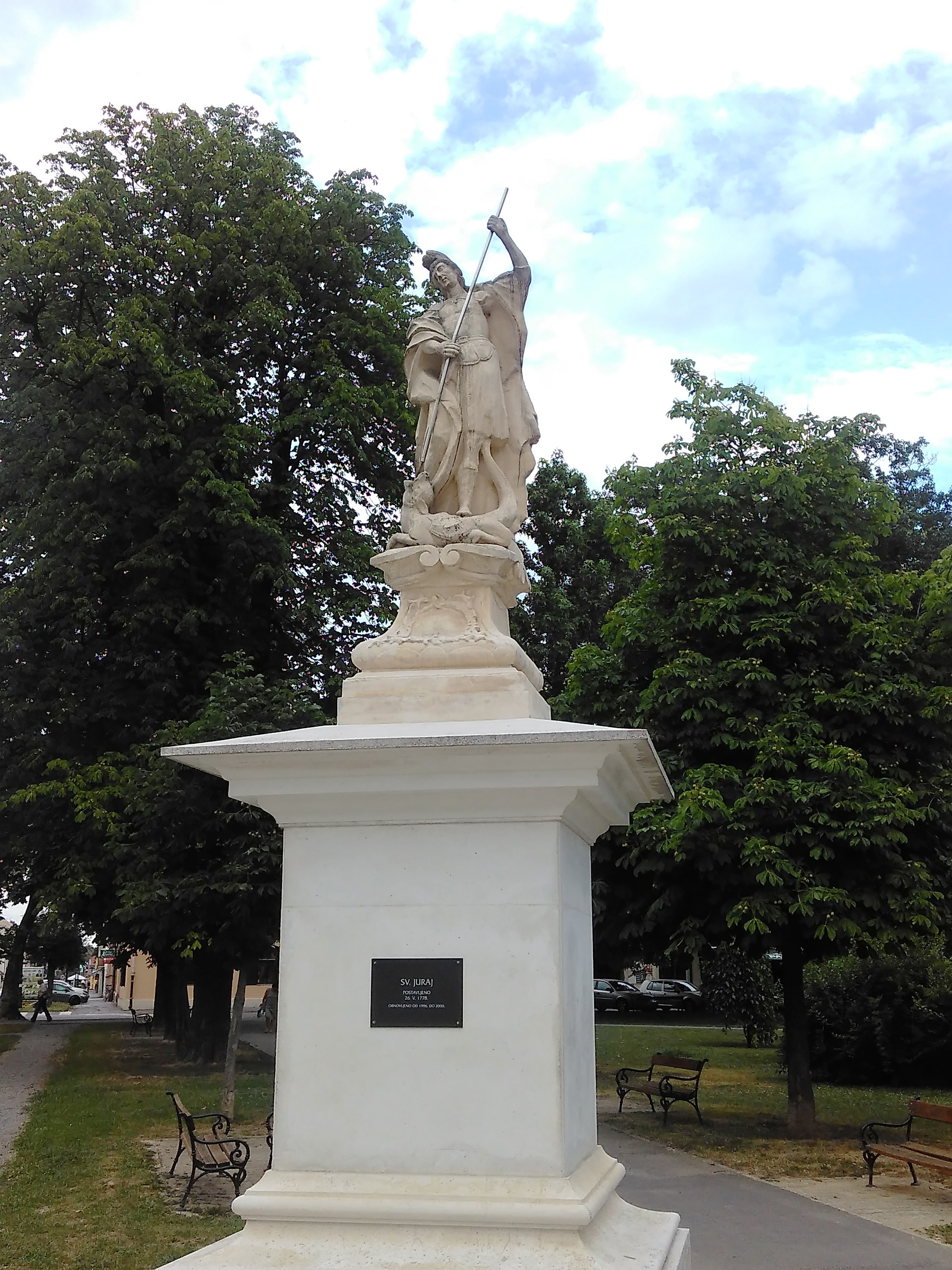
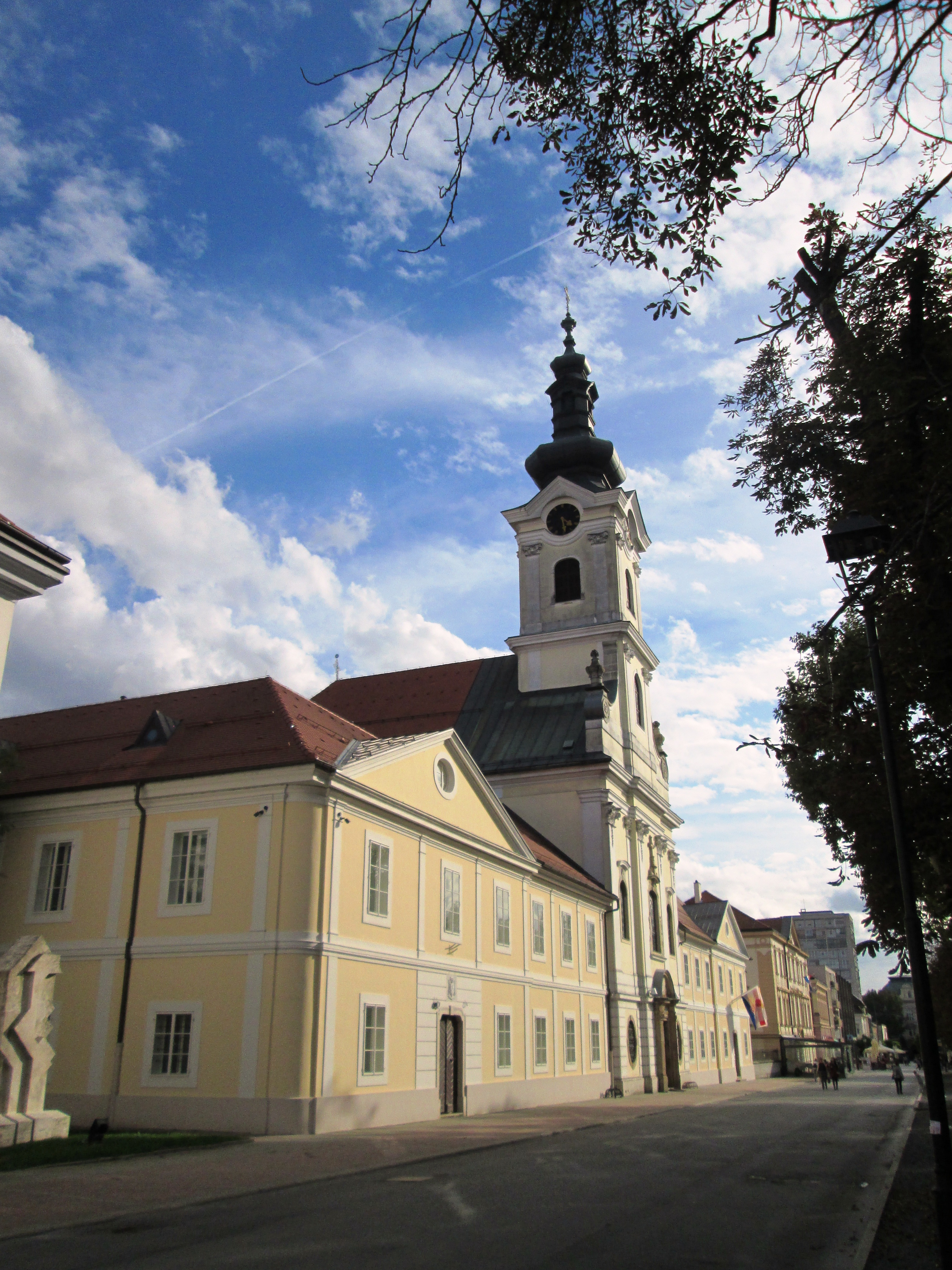
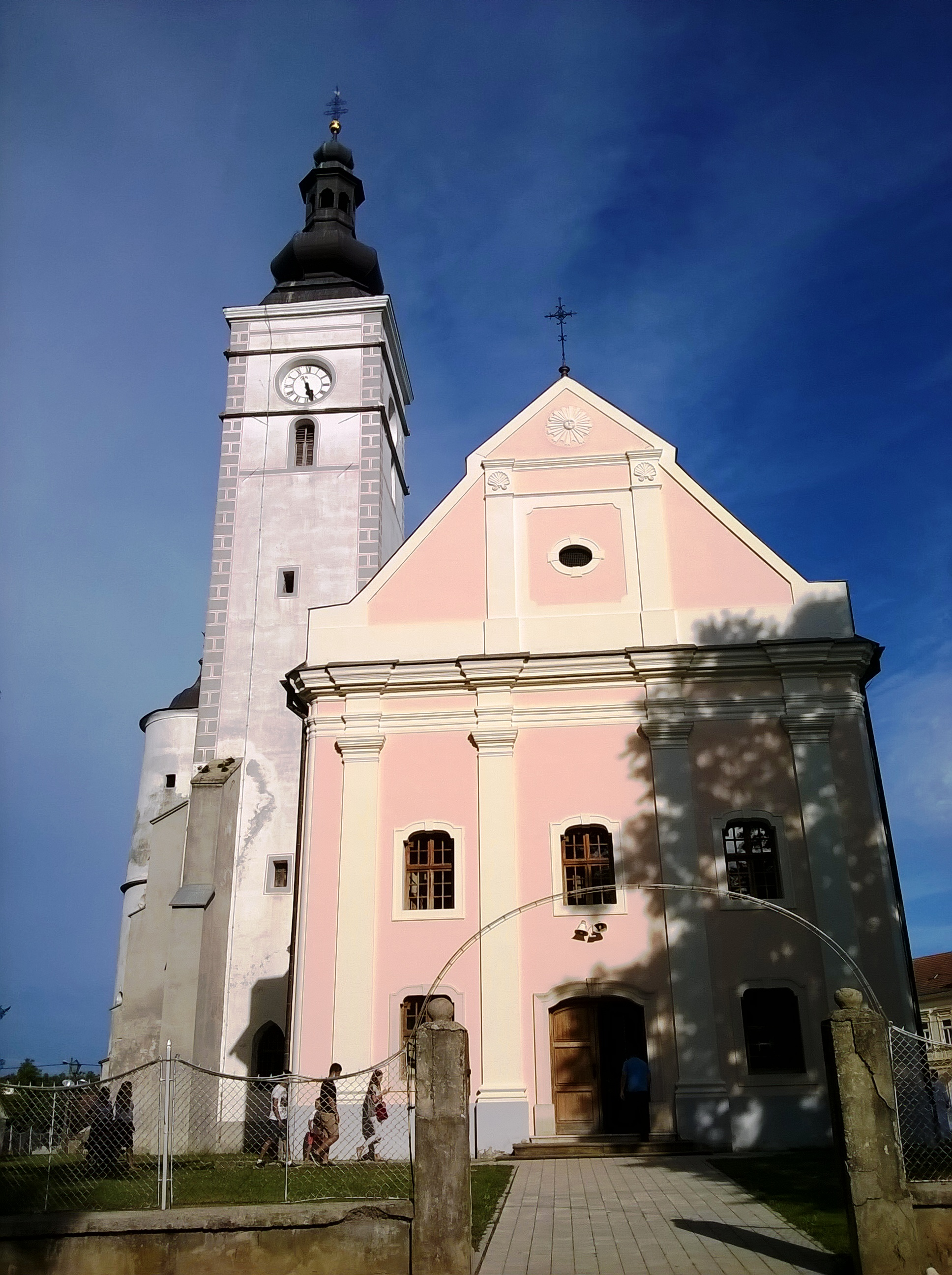
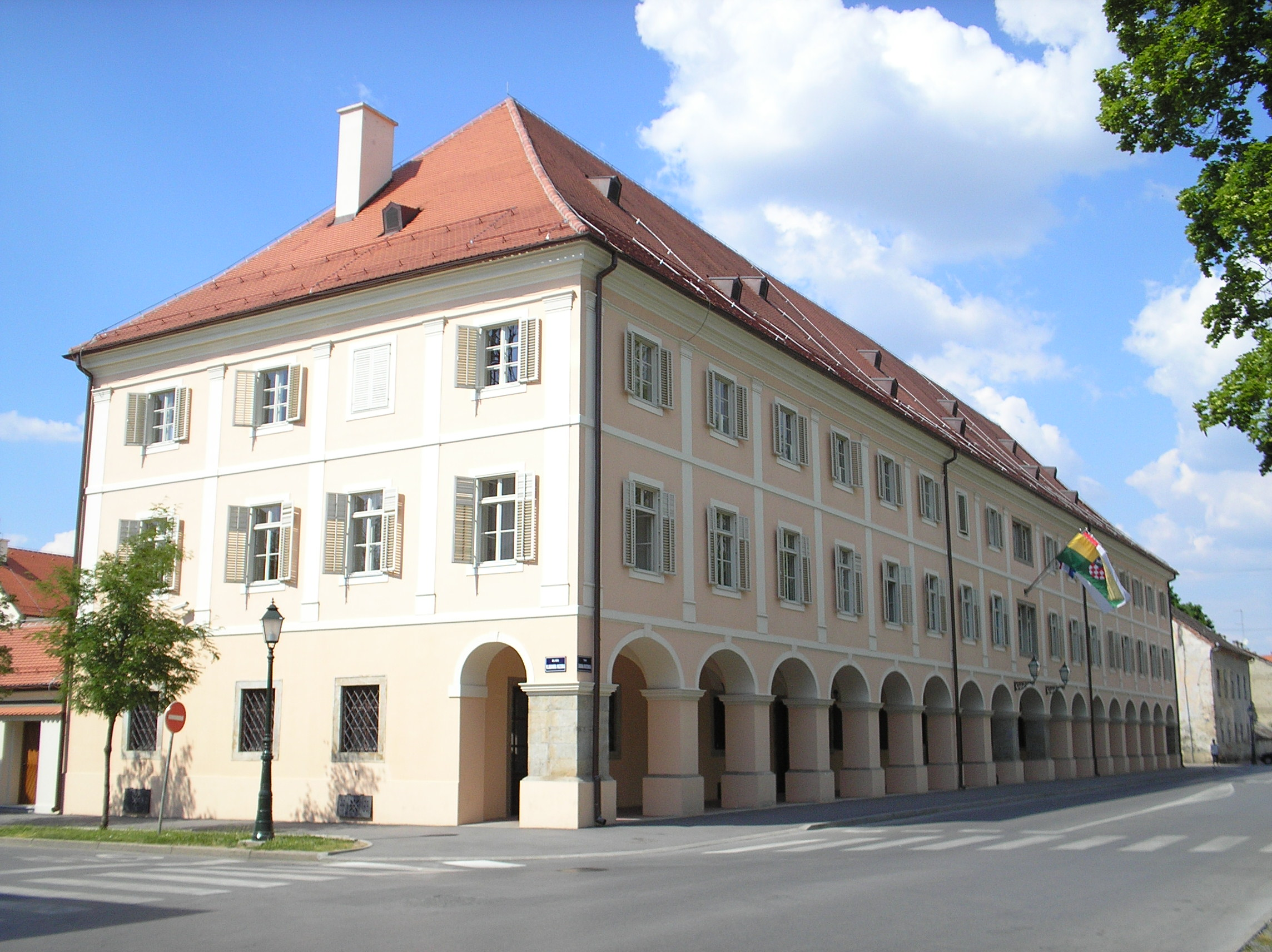
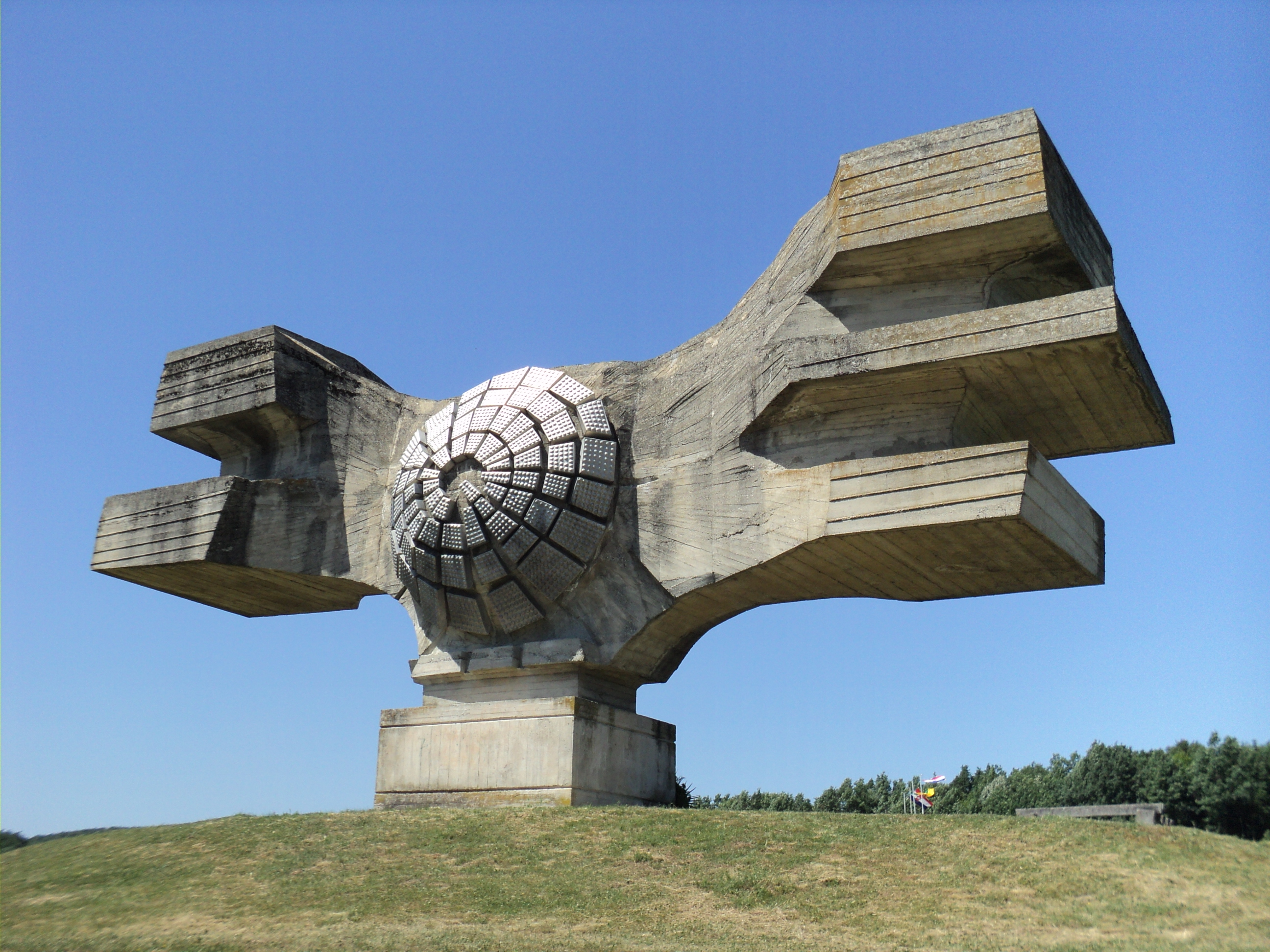
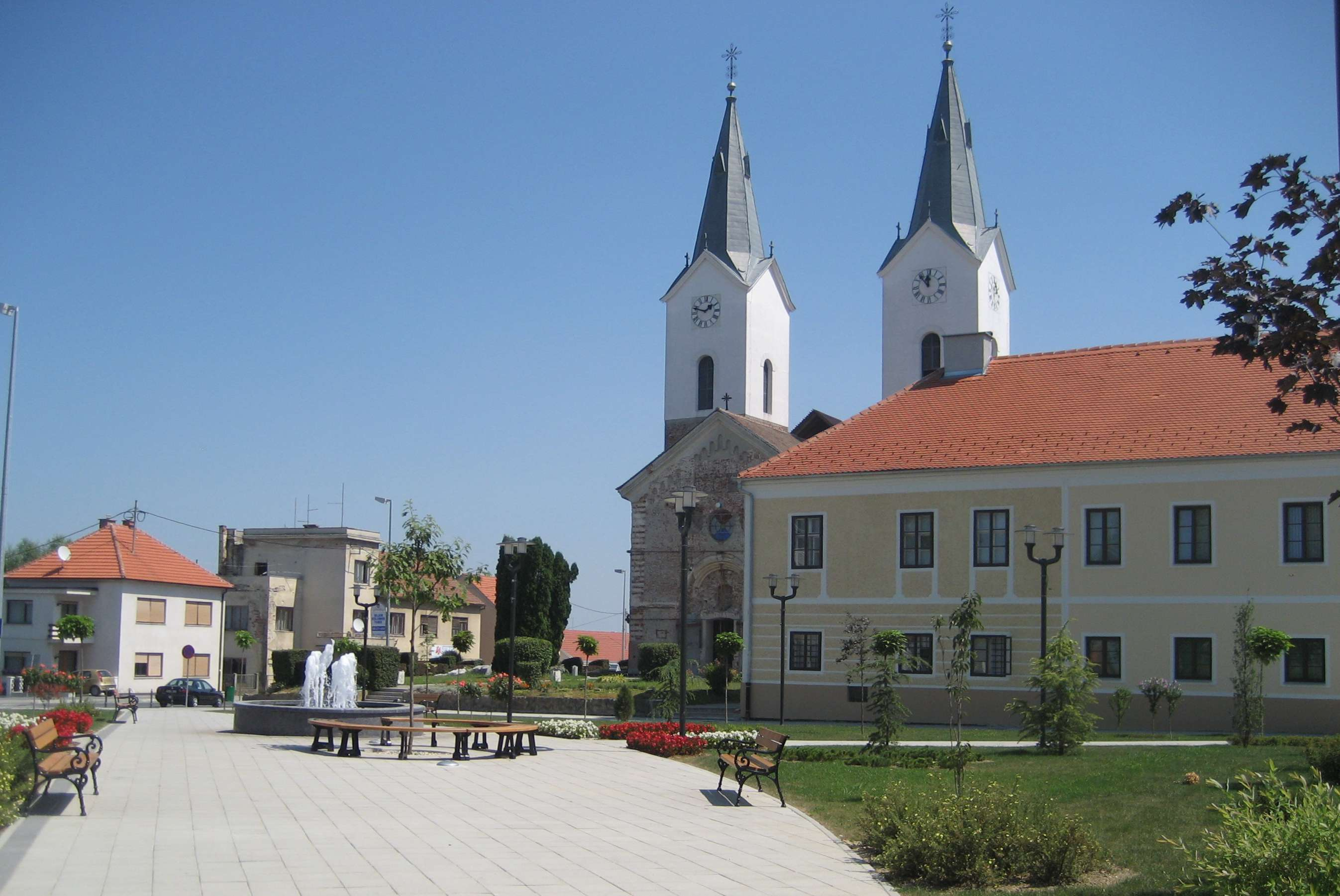
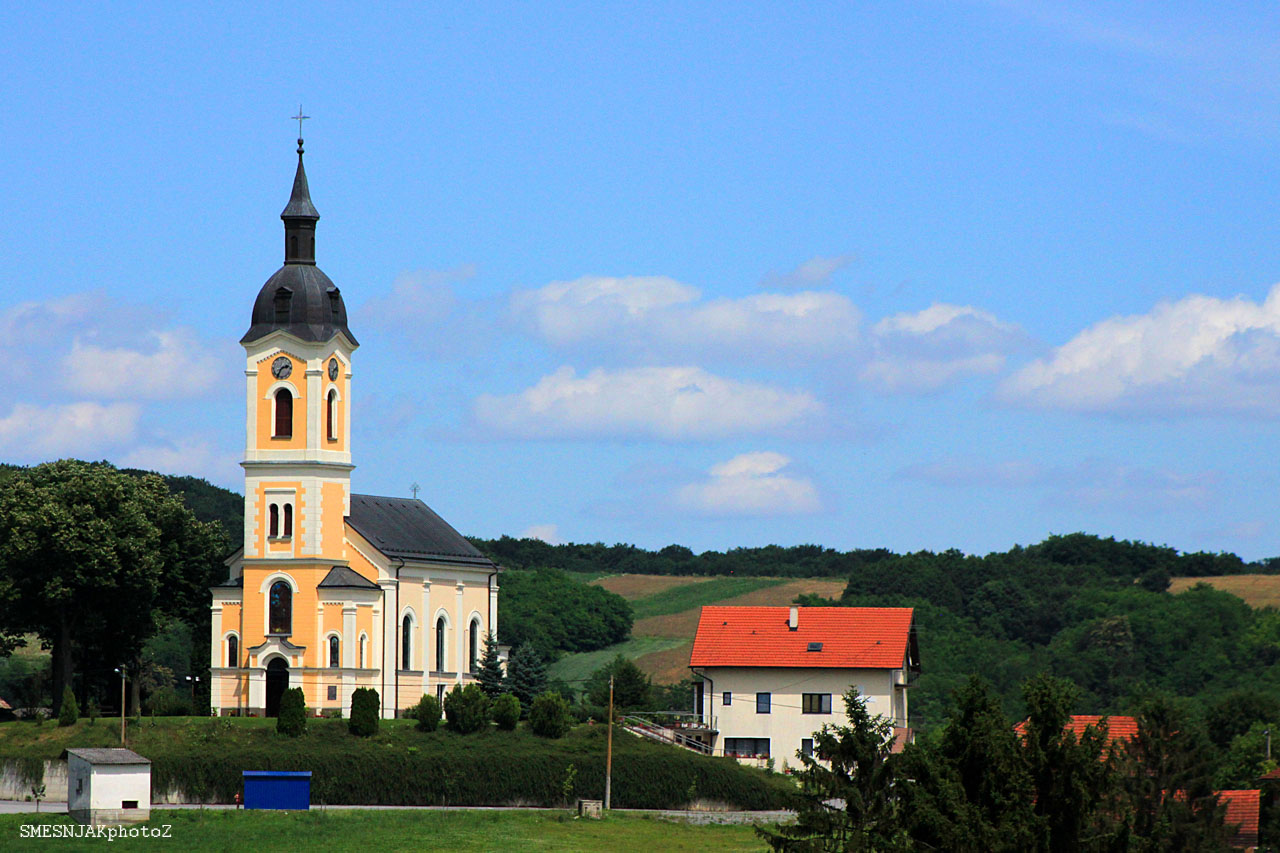

- Flag Coat of arms

- Bjelovar-Bilogora County within Croatia
- Country: Croatia
- County seat: Bjelovar

Government
  - Župan (Prefect): Marko Marušić (HDZ)
  - Assembly: 41 members: • SDP, Ind. Damir Bajs, HNS, HSU, SU, BUZ, HDSS, ORaH, NSH, HSS BR, Ind. (22); • HDZ, HSS, HSLS (17); • MOST (2)

Area
  - Total: 2,640 km^{2} (1,020 sq mi)

Population (2021)
  - Total: 101,879
  - Density: 38.6/km^{2} (99.9/sq mi)
- Area code: 043
- ISO 3166 code: HR-07
- HDI (2022): 0.835 very high · 17th
- Website: www.bbz.hr

Bjelovar-Bilogora County (pronounced [bjêloʋaːr-bîloɡora]; Croatian: Bjelovarsko-bilogorska županija [bjêloʋaːrsko-bîloɡorskaː ʒupǎnija]) is a county in central Croatia.

The central city of Bjelovar was first mentioned in 1413, and it only gained importance when a new fort was built in 1756 to defend against the Ottoman invasions. The town was pronounced a free royal town in 1874.

The other part of the county name is for the hill of Bilogora that stretches along the northern edge of the county.

Other towns in the county are Daruvar, Garešnica, Čazma, and Grubišno Polje.

The Bjelovar-Bilogora County borders on the Koprivnica-Križevci County in the north, Virovitica-Podravina County in the northeast, Požega-Slavonia County in the southeast, Sisak-Moslavina County in the southwest, and Zagreb County in the west.

Alongside the City of Zagreb and Požega-Slavonia County, it is the only Croatian county that does not border another nation.

== Administrative division ==
Bjelovar-Bilogora County is further divided into 5 towns (grad, pl. gradovi) and 18 municipalities (općina, pl. općine).

Towns
Town	Population (2021 census)
Bjelovar	36,316
Čazma	6,930
Daruvar	10,105
Garešnica	8,624
Grubišno Polje	5,367

Municipalities
Municipality	Population (2021 census)
Berek	1,106
Dežanovac	1,978
Đulovac	2,772
Hercegovac	1,910
Ivanska	2,256
Kapela	2,367
Končanica	1,805
Nova Rača	2,756
Rovišće	4,144
Severin	702
Sirač	1,796
Šandrovac	1,411
Štefanje	1,688
Velika Pisanica	1,313
Velika Trnovitica	1,091
Veliki Grđevac	2,316
Veliko Trojstvo	2,379
Zrinski Topolovac	747

== Demographics ==
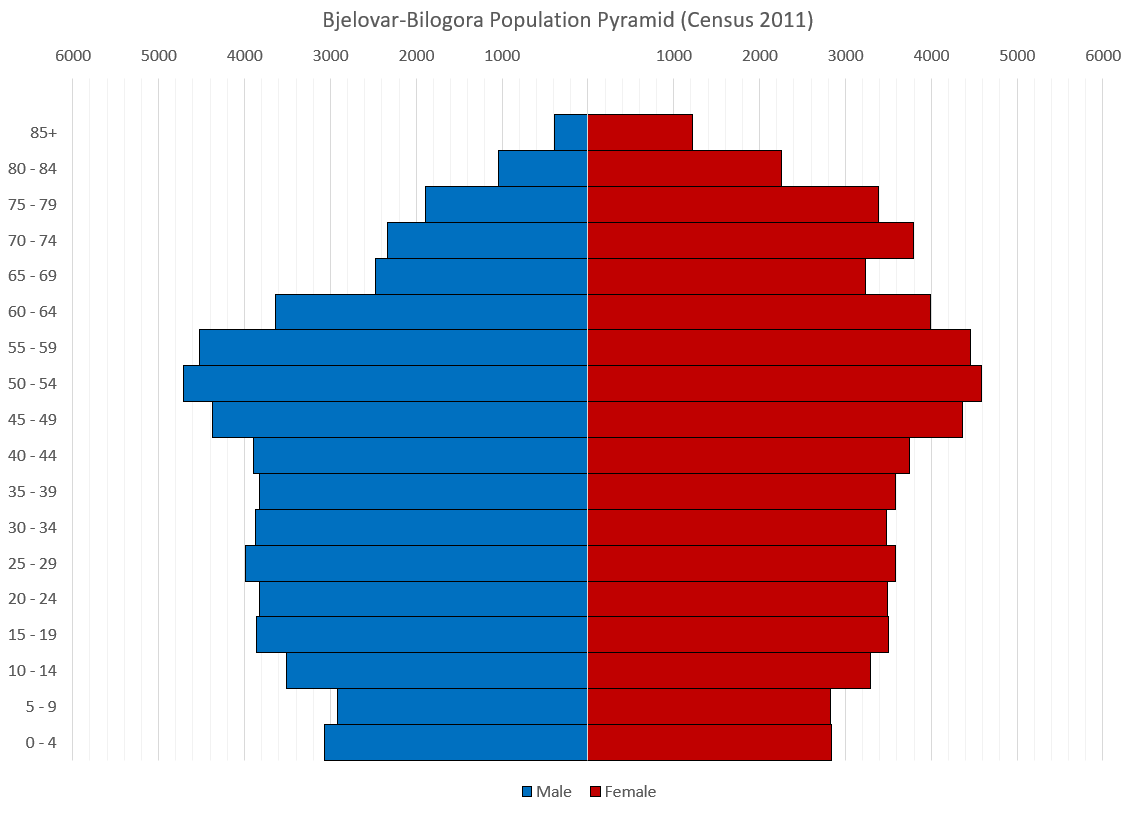
Population pyramid of Bjelovar-Bilogora County per 2011 Census.

Historical populations of Bjelovar-Bilogora County

Year	Pop.	±%
1857	84,893	—
1869	95,981	+13.1%
1880	101,420	+5.7%
1890	130,901	+29.1%
1900	150,825	+15.2%
1910	163,039	+8.1%
1921	162,453	−0.4%
1931	173,597	+6.9%
1948	166,485	−4.1%

Year	Pop.	±%
1953	170,651	+2.5%
1961	167,599	−1.8%
1971	157,811	−5.8%
1981	149,551	−5.2%
1991	144,042	−3.7%
2001	133,084	−7.6%
2011	119,764	−10.0%
2021	101,879	−14.9%

Source: Naselja i stanovništvo Republike Hrvatske 1857–2001, Croatian Bureau of Statistics, Zagreb, 2005

As of the 2021 census, the county had 101,879 residents. The population density was 39 people per km^{2}.

As of the 2011 census, the county had 119,764 residents. The population density was 45 people per km^{2}.

Bjelovar-Bilogora County: Population trends 1857–2021
v

population	84893	95981	101420	130901	150825	163039	162453	173597	166485	170651	167599	157811	149551	144042	133084	119764	101879
	1857	1869	1880	1890	1900	1910	1921	1931	1948	1953	1961	1971	1981	1991	2001	2011	2021

Sources: Croatian Bureau of Statistics publications

Ethnic Croats form the majority with 84.8% of the population, followed by Serbs at 6.3% and Czechs at 5.2%.

== Politics ==
=== Minority councils and representatives ===
Directly elected minority councils and representatives are tasked with consulting tasks for the local or regional authorities in which they are advocating for minority rights and interests, integration into public life and participation in the management of local affairs. At the 2023 Croatian national minorities councils and representatives elections Czechs, Hungarians and Serbs of Croatia all fulfilled legal requirements to each elect their own 25 members minority council of the Bjelovar-Bilogora County while Albanians, Germans, and Romani people in Croatia were electing individual representatives. Some municipalities, towns or cities in the county elected their own local minority councils as well.

Although though the Government of the Republic of Croatia does not guarantee official bilinguialism, the statute of Bjelovar-Bilogora County itself guarantees it for the minority languages Albanian, Czech, Hungarian and Serbian.

== Protected areas ==
- Papuk

== See also ==
- Bjelovar-Križevci County
- List of people from Bjelovar-Bilogora County
